This is a list of Mention in Despatches awarded in the 1945 Birthday Honours.

Royal Navy
Surgeon Captain Gordon Ernest Dormer Ellis (Westbury, Wilts.).
Commander John Wyndham Studholme, DSC (Hawick).
Acting Commander Edmund Henry Cracroft Chapman (Harrogate).
Acting Commander Lawrence Henry Phillips (Retd.).
Commander George William Dobson, RD, RNR (Harpenden).
Commander John Treasure Jones, RD, RNR.
Commander Deny Parsons, RD, RNR (Dollar).
Commander Charles Henry Williams, RD, RNR (Retd.) (Cressage, near Shrewsbury).
Acting Commander Reginald Edkins Clarke, RD, RNR (Durban).
Engineer Commander Harry Barton Olden (Retd.).
Commander (E) Arnold Hirst (Yarmouth).
Commander (E) Arthur Reginald Kirk (Sutton).
Commander (E) Edward Horace Nutter.
Commander (E) William Leonard Spear (Plymouth).
Acting Commander (E) Clifford Ralph Snellgrove (Aylesbury).
Commander (S) John Eustace Pibworth (Broghead, Morayshire).
Temporary Major (Acting Temporary Lieutenant-Colonel) Cecil Ross Borland, Royal Marines (Godalming).
Lieutenant-Commander Eric Hart Dyke (Chagford, Devon).
Lieutenant-Commander Robert Augustus Fell.
Lieutenant-Commander Charles Gerald Forsberg (London).
Lieutenant-Commander Brian Desmond Gallie, DSC (Dorchester).
Lieutenant-Commander Colin Cargill Beveridge Mackenzie (Kingston, Bagpuize, near Abingdon).
Lieutenant-Commander Nigel Edward Godfrey Roper, DSO.
Lieutenant-Commander Peter Van Bredon Wadlow (Budleigh Salterton).
Acting Lieutenant-Commander Philip Kynvin Lankester.
Lieutenant-Commander Charles Alexander Meyer, RD, RNR (Holyhead).
Lieutenant-Commander Geoffrey Ernest Milner, MBE, RD, RNR (Retd.) (Parkstone, Dorset).
Temporary Acting Lieutenant-Commander William Stanley Adams, RNR.
Temporary Acting Lieutenant-Commander (N) John Blair Anderson, RNR (Mauchline, Ayrshire).
Temporary Acting Lieutenant-Commander William Harold Brittain, DSC, RNR (Shrewsbury).
Acting Temporary Lieutenant-Commander Jesse Dixon, RNR (Milford Haven).
Acting Temporary Lieutenant-Commander Walter Gibson, RNR (Kelso).
Temporary Acting Lieutenant-Commander John Edward Miles, RNR (Hull).
Lieutenant-Commander William Chilton Brooks, MBE, RNVR (Birkdale).
Acting Temporary Lieutenant-Commander John Kirke Craig, RNVR(Glasgow).
Temporary Acting Lieutenant-Commander Ronald Fitzgerald Barton Beesley, RNVR
Temporary Acting Lieutenant-Commander Leslie Ernest Humphries Brunton, RNVR (Tonbridge).
Acting Temporary Lieutenant-Commander Leonard Jolly, RNVR (Lytham).
Temporary Acting Lieutenant-Commander Norman Herbert Jones, RNVR (Claygate).
Acting Lieutenant-Commander William Norman Kennedy, RNVR (White Craigs, Renfrewshire).
Temporary Acting Lieutenant-Commander Geoffrey William Le Gallais, RNVR
Temporary Acting Lieutenant-Commander Edward Hugh Pratt, RNVR (Canterbury).
Acting Temporary Lieutenant-Commander Charles William Coslett Stevens, RNVR (Cardiff).
Acting Lieutenant-Commander (A) Bruce John Albert Hawkes (Great Houghton).
Lieutenant-Commander (E) Charles William Gordon Ham.
Lieutenant-Commander (E) Malcolm Hazlitt Sayers, DSC.
Lieutenant-Commander (E) Arthur Francis Turner (London).
Acting Lieutenant-Commander (E) John Nicholas Mutter (Retd.) (Gillingham).
Temporary Lieutenant-Commander (E) Alfred James Brabban, RNR.
Temporary Lieutenant-Commander (E) Alexander Arthur Graham, RNR (Giffnock).
Temporary Lieutenant-Commander (E) Rodney William George Wise, RNR (Bruton, Somerset).
Temporary Acting Lieutenant-Commander (E) John Morrison, RCNR (Vancouver).
Temporary Acting Lieutenant-Commander (E) William Vanderzwan, DSC, RNVR
Surgeon Lieutenant-Commander Frank William Baskerville, LMSSA (Plymouth).
Surgeon Lieutenant-Commander Robert Burns Hamilton Faichney, RNVR (East Kilbride, Lanarkshire).
Temporary Acting Surgeon Lieutenant-Commander Francis Cameron Edington, MB, ChB, RNVR (Penrith).
Temporary Acting Surgeon Lieutenant-Commander (D) Dennison Laverick, LDS, RCS, RNVR (London).
Acting Lieutenant-Commander (S) Geoffrey Harold Lewis Kitson (Hunstanton).
Temporary Acting Lieutenant-Commander (S) Norman Victor Craven, RNVR (Southport).
Temporary Acting Lieutenant-Commander (S) David Hailing Hammond, RNVR
Temporary Acting Lieutenant-Commander (S) Tom Alistair MacFarlane, RNVR (Liverpool).
The Reverend Donovan Bawdon Allen, MA, Temporary Chaplain, RNVR (Birmingham).
Lieutenant Lesley Edney Blackmore (Weston-super-Mare).
Lieutenant George Blackwood.
Lieutenant Jack Broughton Cox (Winchcomb).
Lieutenant Ronald Gargill Campbell Greenlees (Musselburgh).
Lieutenant John Dorsett Owen Hinton.
Lieutenant Alfred Nelson Littleboy (Fulham).
Lieutenant Samuel George Potts (Plymouth).
Lieutenant Laurence Robson.
Lieutenant Howard Thomas Arthur Winnall (Auckland, New Zealand).
Temporary Lieutenant James Ayton (Londonderry).
Lieutenant Charles Peter d'Auvergne Aplin, RNR (London).
Lieutenant Kenneth Maurice Cutler, RNR (Monkseaton).
Lieutenant Peter Stanhope Marchant, RNR (Peaslake, Surrey).
Lieutenant Kenneth Ashley Rowbotham, RNR (Barrow-in-Furness).
Lieutenant Donald Philip Runtz, RNR (Beaconsfield).
Lieutenant Stanley Samuel Mitchell, RNR (Farnham).
Temporary Lieutenant David Lawrence Gall, RNR (Broughty Ferry, Scotland).
Temporary Lieutenant Frank Rowland Pretty, RNR.
Lieutenant Herbert James Spencer, RNVR (London).
Temporary Lieutenant Reginald Charles Anciaume, RNVR (Ealing).
Temporary Lieutenant Thomas David Andrews, RNVR (Felixstowe).
Temporary Lieutenant Kenneth Metcalfe Banks, RNVR (Northallerton).
Temporary Lieutenant Jeffrey Stanway Blackburn, RNVR (Manchester).
Temporary Lieutenant Frank Muil Brackenridge, RNVR (London, N.2).
Temporary Lieutenant Reginald Robert Brett, RNVR (Hounslow).
Temporary Lieutenant Thomas Arthur Byrne, RNVR
Temporary Lieutenant Ernest Gray Cathro, RNVR (Angus).
Temporary Lieutenant Reginald Henry Clifton, RNVR (Haywards Heath).
Temporary Lieutenant Ray Cloberry Christian, RNVR (Derby).
Temporary Lieutenant Harold Aubrey Dale, RNVR (Sunbury-on-Thames).
Temporary Lieutenant Trevor Etienne Bruno de Hamel, RNVR (Lichfield).
Temporary Lieutenant Arthur Dodd, RNVR (Gidea Park).
Temporary Lieutenant Norman Edgar Gibbons, RNVR (Eltham).
Temporary Lieutenant William Eric Myhill Grint, RNVR
Temporary Lieutenant Jock Seton Guthrie, RNVR (Stratford-on-Avon).
Temporary Lieutenant George Hatton, RNVR (London).
Temporary Lieutenant Norman Holloway, RNVR (Doncaster).
Temporary Lieutenant John Hutchinson, RNVR (Halifax).
Temporary Lieutenant Frederick John Jones, RNVR (Berechurch, near Colchester).
Temporary Lieutenant John Hamar Jones, RNVR (Bournemouth).
Temporary Lieutenant Robert Knott, RNVR (Stockport).
Temporary Lieutenant Herbert William Leeds, RNVR (London).
Temporary Lieutenant William Lavell McNaughton, RNVR (Pinner).
Temporary Lieutenant Gordon Oswald Reginald Meyer, RNVR (Putney).
Temporary Lieutenant John Douglas Gordon Mitchell, RNVR (London).
Temporary Lieutenant Douglas Charles Morrison, RNVR (Colchester).
Temporary Lieutenant John Michael Joseph Palmer, RNVR (Leicester).
Temporary Lieutenant Thomas Hayward Pannell, RNVR (Leatherhead).
Temporary Lieutenant Richard Henry Powell, RNVR (Radcliffe-on-Trent).
Temporary Lieutenant Charles Ernest Scrine, RNVR (London).
Temporary Lieutenant Stephen Cuthbert Samuel Skene, RNVR (Durham).
Temporary Lieutenant Edmund Kidson Smith, RNVR (Leeds).
Temporary Lieutenant Raymond William Smith, RNVR (West Bromwich).
Temporary Lieutenant William Alfred Stevens, RNVR (London).
Temporary Lieutenant Donald Sutherland, RNVR (Ashurstwood).
Temporary Lieutenant William Charles Thwaites, RNVR (Shoreham).
Temporary Lieutenant Douglas Alexander John Tratner, RNVR (Llandrindod Wells).
Temporary Lieutenant Reginald Henry Wade, RNVR (High Wycombe).
Temporary Lieutenant Duncan James Campbell Walker, RNVR (Glasgow).
Temporary Lieutenant George Harold Williams, RNVR
Temporary Lieutenant Eric Ronald Wilson, RNVR (Hull).
Temporary Lieutenant Wilfred Arthur Wortham, RNVR (London).
Lieutenant Clive Barker Dillon, RANVR (Sydney).
Temporary Lieutenant Ralph Gerald Murrell, RANVR.
Temporary Lieutenant William Alexander Wood, RANVR (Sydney).
Temporary Lieutenant Croft G. Brook, RCNVR (Vancouver).
Temporary Lieutenant Allen Thomas Fallis, RCNVR (Winnipeg).
Temporary Lieutenant John David Keys, RCNVR (Montreal).
Temporary Lieutenant George Alexander Mavety, RCNVR (Toronto).
Temporary Lieutenant Mervyn Alexander Patterson, VD, RCNVR (Regina, Sask.).
Temporary Lieutenant Richard Miles Steele, RCNVR (St. John, N.B.).
Temporary Lieutenant John Rawson Kenneth Stewart, RCNVR (Cowichan Bay, B.C.).
Temporary Lieutenant Douglas Leonard Hazard, RNZNVR (Hamilton, New Zealand).
Temporary Lieutenant Roderick Thomas McIndoe, RNZNVR (Wanganui, New Zealand).
Temporary Lieutenant Kenneth Howden Webb, RNZNVR (Wellington, New Zealand).
Temporary Acting Lieutenant George Baines, RNVR (Retford).
Temporary Acting Lieutenant David Manson Muir, RNVR (Newton Mearns).
Temporary Acting Lieutenant Peter Frederick Smith, RNVR (Hull).
Temporary Lieutenant (A) Cecil Michael Keller, RNVR (Waterford, Eire).
Acting Lieutenant (A) David Edmond Strachan Pery-Knox-Gore, RNVR (Maclear, Capt Province, S.A.).
Temporary Lieutenant (A) Allen Whitelaw Stewart, RNVR (Rhu, Dumbartonshire).
Temporary Lieutenant (E) Alexander Dennis Taylor (Loughborough).
Acting Lieutenant (E) Clarence George Cole (Plymouth)
Acting Lieutenant (E) William John Sims (Portsmouth).
Temporary Lieutenant (E) Arthur Lionel Benke, RNR (Christchurch, Hants).
Temporary Lieutenant (E) Arthur Elmer Blankley, RNR.
Temporary Lieutenant (E) Thomas Henry Child, RNR (Cardiff).
Temporary Lieutenant (E) Harold Gummer, RNR (Swindon).
Temporary Lieutenant (E) Geoffrey Robert Harry Lewis, RNR (Cardiff).
Temporary Lieutenant (E) Harold Paul James Poulson, RNR (Edinburgh).
Lieutenant (E) Bruce Ford Booth, RCNR (Vancouver).
Temporary Lieutenant (E) Archibald William Ainslie, RNVR (Newcastle upon Tyne).
Temporary Lieutenant (E) Robert Bruce, RNVR (London, S.W.1).
Temporary Lieutenant (E) Stanley James Duncombe, RNVR (London).
Temporary Lieutenant (E) Walter Smith, RNVR (Wirral).
Lieutenant (E) Llewellyn Ivor Jones, RNZNVR (Gloucester).
Temporary Surgeon Lieutenant Gilbert Maurice Baird, MB, ChB, RNVR.
Temporary Surgeon Lieutenant David Russell Kerr, MB, ChB, RNVR (Styal, Lanes).
Lieutenant (S) Peter John Glason (Reading).
Lieutenant (S) Robert Magill Young (Exeter).
Temporary Lieutenant (S) Luis Diez, RNR (Liverpool).
Temporary Lieutenant (S) Rodney George Pullen, RNR.
Temporary Lieutenant (S) Arthur Leslie Bedwell, RNVR (Hornsey).
Temporary Lieutenant (S) Maxwell Burton, RNVR.
Temporary Lieutenant (S) Peter Vivian Lorne, RNVR (Blindley Heath, Surrey).
Temporary Lieutenant (S) John Stoney, RNVR (Whitby).
Temporary Lieutenant (S) Alec Warburton, RNVR (Liverpool).
Lieutenant (S) David Charles Staley, KRNVR (Mombasa).
Margery Rylance Bammant, Second Officer, WRNS.
Skipper Lieutenant Magnus Andrew Smith, RD, RNR, 2388W.S.
Acting Skipper Lieutenant William Cardno, RNR, W.S.2849 (Fraserburgh).
Acting Skipper Lieutenant Arthur George Day, RNR, W.S.2087 (Poulton le Fylde).
Acting Skipper Lieutenant Edward James Day, RNR, W.S.2704.
Acting Chief Skipper James William Greengrass, RNR, W.S.3423 (Grimsby).
Acting Chief Skipper William Henry Makings, RNR (Retd.), W.S.2740 (Grimsby).
Acting Temporary Chief Skipper Robert Cooper, RNR, T.S.384 (Grimsby).
Acting Temporary Chief Skipper Alfred Hales, RNR, T.S.182.
Acting Temporary Chief Skipper George Wingfield Smith, RNR, T.S.118 (Kessingland Beach, hear Lowestoft).
Acting Temporary Chief Skipper Cyril Young, RNR, T.S.542 (Hull).
Skipper Vincent Nicolini, MBE, RNR, T.S.628 (Hull).
Skipper George Sutherland, RNR, W.S.3726 (Hopeman, Morayshire).
Temporary Skipper Frederick Webb, RNR, T.S.785.
Temporary Skipper George Wood, RNR, T.8.966 (Aberdeen).
Mr. Donovan John Shedlock Newton, Chief Officer, RFA.
Temporary Sub-Lieutenant Robert William Burke, RNVR (Weybridge).
Temporary Sub-Lieutenant Frank Robert Dixon, RNVR.
Temporary Sub-Lieutenant Leonard Fewell, RNVR (Brighton).
Temporary Sub-Lieutenant Peter Stanley Gregory, RNVR (Taunton).
Temporary Sub-Lieutenant Peter John Kelly, RNVR (London).
Temporary Sub-Lieutenant Derek Basil Laughton, RNVR (Cuckfield).
Temporary Sub-Lieutenant Frank Paul MacPhail, RNVR (London).
Temporary Sub-Lieutenant Sidney Anthony Rotheray, RNVR (Ilkley).
Temporary Sub-Lieutenant James Buchan Stott, RNVR (Plymouth).
Temporary Sub-Lieutenant (A) Dennis Mansfield, RNVR (Bournemouth).
Temporary Sub-Lieutenant (A) Peter George Henry Roome, RNVR (Greenock).
Temporary Acting Sub-Lieutenant (E) Ralph Mackintosh (Monmouth).
Temporary Sub-Lieutenant (E) William Ernest Cooper, RNVR (Bebiagton).
Temporary Lieutenant Cuthbert Denton Collingwood, Royal Marines (Bolton).
Mr. Cornelius Stephen Lyons, Commissioned Gunner (Hoylake).
Mr. Ernest George Wye, Commissioned Gunner.
Mr. Norman Jack Dominy, Gunner (Thornton Heath).
Mr. Albert James Hooper Glanville, Temporary Gunner (Harrow).
Mr. Edward Gibson Hadley, Temporary Gunner (Gillingham).
Mr. James Alfred Matthews, Gunner (T) (Brighton).
Mr. John Oakley, Temporary Warrant Shipwright (Devonport).
Mr. Edward George Smith, Temporary Warrant Shipwright (Gillingham).
Mr. Frank William White, Acting Warrant Shipwright (Southsea).
Mr. Henry Charles Hillind, MBE, Commissioned Boatswain (Newport, Isle of Wight).
Mr. John Percival Finch, Boatswain (Portsmouth).
Mr. Geoffrey Alan Bloodworth, Signal Boatswain.
Mr. Alan George Pamplin, Warrant Telegraphist (Doncaster).
Mr. Reginald George Steward, Temporary Acting Warrant Master-at-Arms.
Mr. Ambrose Thomas Beckett, Warrant Engineer.
Mr. Archibald Christopher Menzies, Warrant Engineer (Chatham).
Mr. Arthur Edward Bird, Temporary Warrant Engineer (Surbiton).
Mr. Frederick Robert Blaber, DSM (Newquay).
Mr. Cyril Desmond Carpenter, Temporary Warrant Engineer (Middlesbrough).
Mr. Stewart Harold Dutton, Temporary Warrant Engineer (Brinscombe, Gloucester).
Mr. Leslie Norris, Temporary Warrant Engineer (Purbrook).
Mr. Leonard Hicks Williams, Temporary Warrant Engineer (Gillingham).
Mr. William Henry Gillard, Temporary Warrant Electrician (Selsey).
Mr. Richard Belton Brooks, Warrant Mechanician (Portsmouth).
Mr. John Edwin Dearlove, Temporary Warrant Mechanician.
Mr. Walter Thomas Francklin, Temporary Warrant Wardmaster (Deal).
Mr. Albert Charles Gundry, Temporary Warrant Writer Officer (Portsmouth).
Mr. Ernest Wilfred Larke, Warrant Stores Officer (Gillingham).
Mr. George Alfred Moore, Temporary Warrant Stores Officer (Plymouth).
Chief Petty Officer Frank Henry Bates, D/J.109636 (Exmouth).
Chief Petty Officer John Brodie, D/J.39012 (Edinburgh).
Chief Petty Officer Richard Ernest Chambers, BEM, P/J.33143 (Brighton).
Chief Petty Officer Frederick James Churches, C/J.104283 (Seven Kings).
Chief Petty Officer Richard Lionel Courtenay, DSM, D/J.106382 (Launceston).
Chief Petty Officer Leonard William Hiscock, P/J.37448.
Chief Petty Officer Horace Sidney Keith, P/J.107705.
Chief Petty Officer Sydney Walter King, D/J.34048 (Liskeard, Cornwall).
Chief Petty Officer Charles James Wallace Morgan, D/J.100025.
Chief Petty Officer John Munro, C/JX.127738 (Dover).
Chief Petty Officer (Gunner's Mate) Edward Kennedy Parnell, P/J.114864 (Hornsea).
Chief Petty Officer Frank William Arthur Pearsall, C/JX.127292 (Rochester).
Chief Petty Officer Leslie Oliver Porter, RCNR, A.2124 (Hamilton, Ontario).
Chief Petty Officer Walter Ferdinand Rutter, DSM, C/JX.125245.
Chief Petty Officer Ernest Edward Stanley, DSM, D/J.107905 (Walton-on-Thames).
Chief Petty Officer Richard William Wakeford, R.209133 (East Barnet).
Chief Petty Officer Robert Webber, R.C.N.2914 (Vancouver).
Chief Petty Officer William Weller, D/J.107061 (Horsham).
Temporary Chief Petty Officer Harry Arksey, C/J.114674 (Hull).
Temporary Chief Petty Officer Arthur Bowden, D/J.98430 (Plymouth).
Temporary Chief Petty Officer William Cross, P/J.383.
Temporary Chief Petty Officer Frederick Arthur Gibbs, C/JX.132279 (London).
Temporary Chief Petty Officer Harold John Mahood, C/JX.126390 (Peckham).
Temporary Chief Petty Officer Eric Frank Osmay Moore, P/J.92945 (Portsmouth).
Acting Chief Petty Officer John William Redpath, C/JX.144791.
Acting Chief Petty Officer William Porte, D/J.101896 (Grimsby).
Master-at-Arms Harold Henry Coleman, D/M.39836
Master-at-Arms Frederick Henry Dawe, D/MX.40111 (Weymouth).
Master-at-Arms George Dermody, D/M.40169 (Devonport).
Master-at-Arms John David Percy Skinner, C.M.39857 (Sidcup).
Master-at-Arms Richard Stewart Worth, D/M.39632 (Devonport).
Temporary Master-at-Arms Frank Arthur Frederick Hatch, C/M.40097 (Fort William).
Temporary Master-at-Arms Alfred Charles Lynch, BEM, C/MX.59273 (Sandgate).
Chief Yeoman of Signals Lemuel Charles Burgess, P/J.41934 (Eastbourne).
Chief Yeoman of Signals William Deeley, C/JX.133188 (Islington).
Chief Yeoman of Signals John Edward Giddings, C/JX.133765 (London).
Chief Yeoman of Signals James William Small, D/JX.132902 (Torquay).
Chief Yeoman of Signals John Lorimer Ward, P/JX.129291 (Lough).
Temporary Chief Yeoman of Signals Albert Samuel Burrell, D/J.110636 (Wallsend-on-Tyne).
Chief Petty Officer Telegraphist Ernest George Charles Butcher, P/JX.134575 (Cockley, near Warminster).
Chief Petty Officer Telegraphist Charles Edward Cock, P/JX.155788 (Portsmouth).
Chief Petty Officer Telegraphist Alfred Goldsmith, P/J.69649 (Probus, Cornwall).
Chief Petty Officer Telegraphist Ernest Alfred Guinevan, P/JX.131077 (London).
Chief Petty Officer Telegraphist Percy William Hancock, P/JX.126610 (Portsmouth).
Chief Petty Officer Telegraphist Walter White Hodges, P/JX.130111.
Chief Petty Officer Telegraphist William Charles Prior, P/J.79059 (Liverpool).
Chief Petty Officer Telegraphist Michael Wafer, D/JX.133000 (Aglada, Co. Cork).
Temporary Chief Petty Officer Telegraphist Alexander Wigham McIntosh, C/JX.390469 (Ayr).
Chief Engine Room Artificer Forrest William Atkins, D/M.2818 (Newark).
Chief Engine Room Artificer Simeon Bailey, D/188.E.D (Barrow-in-Furness).
Chief Engine Room Artificer Daniel Frederick Baker, C/MX.56841 (Farnham).
Chief Engine Room Artificer Lawrence Mortimore Barker, C/MX.49805 (Bedford).
Chief Engine Room Artificer Lionel Button, C/M.33838.
Chief Engine Room Artificer Robert Edwin Clague, DSM, C/MX.50607 (Balorine, Isle of Man).
Chief Engine Room Artificer Charles Frederick Morton Clark, C/MX.4600o.
Chief Engine Room Artificer Stanley Richard Clark, D/M.34908 (Plymouth).
Chief Engine Room Artificer Lawrence Henry Bawden Day, C/M.38786 (Plymouth).
Chief Engine Room Artificer Frederick Ronald Earp, C/MX.47847 (Alton).
Chief Engine Room Artificer Francis George Gardner, C/MX.49504 (Fratton).
Chief Engine Room Artificer Charles Jack Harris, C/MX.49763.
Chief Engine Room Artificer Kenneth George Hayman, DSM, C/M.36696 (Borstal, Kent).
Chief Engine Room Artificer Charles Robert Hayton, P/MX.54680 (Thornaby-on-Tees).
Chief Engine Room Artificer Ernest Redver Head, D/MX.47780.
Chief Engine Room Artificer Edmund Walter Thomas Janes, P/MX.55095 (Portsmouth).
Chief Engine Room Artificer Douglas Royston Matthews, D/MX.46196.
Chief Engine Room Artificer Thomas James William Powell, P/MX.55749 (Cosham).
Chief Engine Room Artificer Terence William Ransley, P/MX.45644 (Portsmouth).
Chief Engine Room Artificer George Harry Rolls, DSM, P/MX.49955.
Chief Engine Room Artificer Albert WilKam Smith, D/M.28824 (Plymouth).
Chief Engine Room Artificer William Bertie Smithfield, D/MX.47036 (Gollant Park, Cornwall).
Chief Engine Room Artificer Bernard Newberry Tolchard, C/M.7082 (Gillingham).
Chief Engine Room Artificer Charles Harry Timms, DSM, C/MX.49743 (Gillingham).
Chief Engine Room Artificer Albert Edward Wood, C/MX.48509 (Iver, Bucks).
Temporary Chief Engine Room Artificer Frederick Hugh Venables, D/MX.48546.
Temporary Chief Engine Room Artificer William George Wright, C/MX.4998 (Portsmouth).
Temporary Acting Chief Engine Room Artificer Thomas Joseph Campbell, C/MX.49496 (Lisburne, Co. Antrim).
Acting Chief Engine Room Artificer Robert Atkinson, D/MX.48887 (Sheffield).
Temporary Acting Chief Engine Room Artificer Desmond Arthur Barnard, D/MX.54586 (Plymouth).
Temporary Acting Chief Engine Room Artificer Walter Gwynne Jones, P/MX.55654 (Ponlyberem, Carmarthenshire).
Temporary Acting Chief Engine Room Artificer Maurice Victor William Ransom, C/MX.49520.
Acting Chief Engine Room Artificer William Tyerman, C/MX.49942.
Acting Chief Engine Room Artificer George Thomas Wallis, C/MX.48683 (Chatham).
Engine Room Artificer 1st Class Robert Hugh Gornall, C/MX.46184 (Ashford).
Engine Room Artificer 1st Class James Henry Stevens, D/M.24139.
Engine Room Artificer 1st Class John Henry Davis, C/MX.56635 (Farnham).
Engine Room Artificer 2nd Class Douglas Alfred Broderick, D/MX.53062.
Engine Room Artificer 2nd Class William Richard Chamberlain, D/X.2901EA (Bristol).
Engine Room Artificer 2nd Class Horace Arnold Filmore, P/MX.53576 (Ryde).
Engine Room Artificer 3rd Class John Jenkin Bonsor, D/MX.60542 (Newton Grange).
Engine Room Artificer 3rd Class James Cathcart, P/MX.79649 (Hamilton, Lanarkshire).
Engine Room Artificer 3rd Class Eric Brotherston Cooper, C/MX.53092 (Gillingham).
Engine Room Artificer 3rd Class Barney John Cummings, D/MX.73347 (Dunkirk, France).
Engine Room Artificer 3rd Class Sidney Dawes, D/MX.56208.
Engine Room Artificer 3rd Class Reginald Francis Hugh Dowd, D/MX.51748 (Plymouth).
Engine Room Artificer 3rd Class Ben Richard Erridge, C/MX.65516 (Aberdeen).
Engine Room Artificer 3rd Class Frederick John Evans, D/MX.74237 (Cardiff).
Engine Room Artificer 3rd Class Joshua Hallam, C / MX.71352.
Engine Room Artificer 3rd Class Thomas Heffernan, D/MX.55835 (Manchester).
Engine Room Artificer 3rd Class Thomas Liptrot, C/MX.73449 (Timperley).
Engine Room Artificer 3rd Class Stanley Swan, D/MX.70667 (Bedlington).
Engine Room Artificer 3rd Class Ernest Frederick Waite, D/MX.60517 (Bristol).
Engine Room Artificer 3rd Class Gordon Wood, C/MX.76148 (Chesterfield).
Engine Room Artificer 3rd Class William Wood, P/MX.69952 (Burntisland, Fife).
Engine Room Artificer Frederick Henry Clarke, P/MX.60424 (Milford-on-Sea).
Engine Room Artificer George Wilfred Hargreaves, C/JX.506647 (Esher).
Air Artificer 3rd Class Norman Day, FAA/FX.75062 (St. Leonard's-on-Sea).
Air Artificer John Langley, FAA/SFX.213 (Ipswich).
Chief Electrical Artificer George Philip Smith, C/MX.46563 (Portsmouth).
Chief Electrical Artificer Walter William Samson, C/M.39485.
Electrical Artificer 1st Class Sampson Charles Gripton, C/M.30423 (Gillingham).
Electrical Artificer 3rd Class George Ernest Earn, P/MX.61481 (Enfield).
Electrical Artificer 3rd Class Richard Stansfield, D/MX.62510.
Chief Ordnance Artificer Walter William Coles, P/MX.47266 (Portsmouth).
Chief Ordnance Artificer Jack George Heath, P/MX.47812 (Portsmouth).
Chief Ordnance Artificer James Albert Mitchell, P/MX.57714.
Ordnance Artificer 1st Class Arthur Dane Jeffery, D/M.394&6.
Ordnance Artificer 3rd Class Arthur James Higginson, D/MX.64101 (Burbage, Leicestershire).
Ordnance Artificer 3rd Class John Edward Ratcliffe, C/MX.66740 (Manchester).
Ordnance Artificer 3rd Class Leslie Charles Tolcher, D/MX.49968 (Plymouth).
Chief Mechanician Evan Henry Brown, D/K.59719 (Plymouth).
Mechanician 1st Class Reginald Charles Digby, C/KX.88896 (Leigh-on-Sea).
Mechanician 1st Class Thomas Charles Frederick Morphew, P/KX.90282 (Portsmouth).
Chief Motor Mechanic Gilbert Begg, C/MX.68727 (Aboyne).
Chief Motor Mechanic Thomas Eric Padbury, P/MX.116836 (Wappenbury, Warwickshire).
Chief Motor Mechanic James Edwin Alfred Southeard, D/MX.67098.
Acting Chief Motor Mechanic 4th Class Alexander Masson Taylor, C/MX.76150 (Stonehaven).
Chief Stoker Walter Allen Applin, C/K.60587 (Bournemouth).
Chief Stoker Sidney Beck, C/K.59923 (Gillingham).
Chief Stoker Ernest Thomas Bowler, D/K.65404 (Whitefield).
Chief Stoker John Nicholas James Davies, D/K.65957 (Redruth).
Chief Stoker Albert Edney, DSM, P/K.59031 (Portsmouth).
Chief Stoker James Evans, P/K.61174 (Fortrose).
Chief Stoker William Arthur Frost, D/KX.76982 (Plymouth).
Chief Stoker William Acton Griffiths, P/KX.77013 (Manchester).
Chief Stoker Charles Harold Frank Hanks, D/K.55788 (Heamore, Cornwall).
Chief Stoker Herbert John Mitchell, C/K.56457 (Sittingbourne).
Chief Stoker Joseph Moody, P/KX.78522.
Chief Stoker Stanley Herbert Murphy, C/K.64917 (Swansea).
Chief Stoker George Henry Osborne, D/K.65285 (Tavistock).
Chief Stoker Frederick Thomas Patrick Paddon, D/K.54730 (Newton Abbot).
Chief Stoker Richard James Palmer, D/K.66140 (Wells).
Chief Stoker Arthur Leonard Potts, C/K.60552 (Wouldham, Kent).
Chief Stoker John Charles Ricketts, D'/K.57390 (Plymouth).
Chief Stoker Sidney Albert Rogers, C/K.60240 (Sittingbourne).
Chief Stoker Arthur Schofield, C/K.60737 (Oldham).
Chief Stoker William Charles Sewell, C/K.59483 (Hendon).
Chief Stoker Gerald Arthur Studden, D/KX.75518 (St. Dominic, Cornwall).
Chief Stoker Bernard Trevaskis, D/K.56389 (Plymouth).
Chief Stoker George Edward Whiffen, C/K.29785 (Eltham).
Temporary Chief Stoker Harold Sydney Clark, P/K.60028 (Portsmouth).
Temporary Chief Stoker Denis Salter, D/K.65039 (Ballinure, Eire).
Chief Engineman George Chorlton, LT/KX.112800 (Hull).
Wartime Chief Engineman Ernest Leonard Fisher, LT/KX.125301.
Chief Engineman John William Hewson, LT/X.259W (Hartlepool).
Chief Engineman Alexander Jappy, LT/X.451 E.U (Port Knockie).
Chief Engineman Ernest OXtoby, LT/KX.124851.
Chief Engineman George Ross, LT/KX.113961.
Temporary Chief Joiner Frederick Shellcock, C/MX.47106 (Rotherham).
Chief Shipwright Alfred John Baker, D/M.39510 (Plymouth).
Chief Shipwright Edwin Arnold Payne, P/MX.47482 (Cosham).
Temporary Chief Shipwright Stanley Alfred Handley, P/MX.50821.
Shipwright 3rd Class Ernest Clifford Masterton, P/MX.88618 (Cbwes).
Second Hand Harry George Fletcher, LT/X.21396A (Lowestoft).
Wartime Second Hand James Patrick Hargreaves, LT/JX.167011 (Fleetwood).
Second Hand Robert William Hovell, LT/X.18936.
Second Hand Thomas Edward Jackson, LT/JX.174484 (Hoylake).
Second Hand James Douglas Mayall, LT/X.20534A (Lowestoft).
Second Hand George Anderson Thompson, LT/JX.280425 (Cellar Dyke, Fife).
Carpenter David Thomas Booth, N.A.P.655218 (London, N.W.10).
Temporary Sick Berth Chief Petty Officer Arthur George Popplewell, D/MX.47460 (Plympton).
Temporary Chief Petty Officer Writer Robert Frank Bull, P/MX.59933 (Southampton).
Temporary Chief Petty Officer Writer James Booth Thornton, C/MX.52445 (North Shields).
Stores Chief Petty Officer William Evans, D/MX.47504 (Shrewsbury).
Stores Chief Petty Officer William Arthur Langdon, P/MX.51129.
Stores Chief Petty Officer Maurice John Perrin, D/MX.48819 (Wadebridge).
Stores Chief Petty Officer Jack Taylor, C/M.87884.
Stores Chief Petty Officer James Wellard, C/MX.51151 (Gillingham).
Stores Chief Petty Officer Albert George Wilson, C/M.29726 (Gillingham).
Stores Chief Petty Officer Gordon Knowle Williams, D/MX.45447 (Exmouth).
Temporary Stores Chief Petty Officer Harold Pritchard, C/MX.47522.
Temporary Stores Chief Petty Officer Joseph Frederick Rockey, P/MX.53439 (Hove).
Temporary Stores Chief Petty Officer Edward Sydney John Rose, P/MX.52719 (Southsea).
Chief Petty Officer Cook (S) Percy James Bailey, D/MX.45584 (Plymouth).
Chief Petty Officer Cook Alfred Ernest Hamley, D/M.35158 (Plymouth).
Chief Petty Officer Cook (S) Cyril Douglas Hughes, P/MX.46494 (Portsmouth).
Chief Petty Officer Cook (S) Frank George Pearson, C/M.37811 (Chatham).
Chief Petty Officer Cook Charlie Stemp, C/M.13320 (Rainham).
Chief Petty Officer Cook (S) Henry Bardwell Ward, C/MX.45952 (Gillingham).
Temporary Chief Petty Officer Cook (S) John Newton, R.C.N.40512 (Strathmore, P.Q.).
Acting Chief Petty Officer Cook (O) David Geddes Burns, P/MX.64305 (Glasgow).
Acting Chief Petty Officer Cook (O) Stanley Mostyn Joffre Wiggins, D/MX.55961 (Barry Dock, South Wales).
Canteen Manager Joe Neill, C/NX.1425 (Keighley).
Chief Steward Clarence Patrick Healey, R.F.A.
Chief Steward 1st Class Frank Winston Sawle, NAP/1093867 (Southport).
Colour Sergeant (Acting Temporary Quartermaster Sergeant) John Roberts, RM, Ch.X.332 (Grays, Essex).
Petty Officer Stanley Booth, P/J.112458.
Petty Officer Thomas Sidney Carey, D/J.113396 (Devonport).
Petty Officer Frederick Joseph Carter, D/JX.152248 (Devonport).
Petty Officer James Bertie Christie, LT/JX.200834 (Hampton).
Petty Officer Frank Edmund John Church, LT/JX.164571 (Great Yarmouth).
Petty Officer Thomas Richard Cranstone, C/J.101792 (South Harrow).
Petty Officer James Heber Crawford, P/J.100899 (Welling).
Petty Officer Henry James Curtis, LT/JX.193925 (Norwich).
Petty Officer Edward Newton Darke, P/J.108434 (Southsea).
Petty Officer Leonard Davis, P/JX.145997 (Bosham, Surrey).
Petty Officer Frank Charles Devoil, C/JX.131005 (Bexhill-on-Sea).
Petty Officer Charles Dunne, D/J.110526 (Dublin).
Petty Officer George William Elliott, D/JX.125750 (Devonport).
Petty Officer Alfred Wrinkmore English, P/JX.136551 (Southsea).
Petty Officer George Frost, D/J.98742 (Granton).
Petty Officer Rigger John Gilmour, R/JX.166938.
Petty Officer Anthony John Parker Hammond, P/JX.148347 (Malvern Links).
Petty Officer Ernest Arthur James Holland, D/J.109637 (Truro).
Petty Officer Leslie Walter Humphrey, C/JX.145765 (Ipswich).
Petty Officer John Douglas Percy Jacobs, C/JX.143690 (Hunstanton).
Petty Officer David Ellis Jones, LT/JX.198770 (Criccieth).
Petty Officer Alfred Harold Leggett, P/J.107359 (Basingstoke).
Petty Officer Henry William Lucas, LT/JX.189944 (Ashford, Kent).
Petty Officer John Henry McNulty, D/SSX.12549 (Blackpool).
Petty Officer Whyburn Parkes, D/JX.135812 (Castleford, Yorks).
Petty Officer Frank Phillipson, C/JX.133699.
Petty Officer Albert Ernest Pickett, C/JX.133549 (Gravesend).
Petty Officer John Clifford Poole, C/JX.189200 (Richmond).
Petty Officer Norman Stanley Redmond, LT/JX.212660 (Poole).
Petty Officer Joseph Colin Sadler, D/J.97604.
Petty Officer Archie Murray Salter, P/JX.125507 (Porchester).
Petty Officer Alfred Richard Ernest Shreeve, LT/JX.181748 (Lowestoft).
Petty Officer Francis Verrill, LT/JX.202267 (Whitby).
Petty Officer Alexander Louvain Webber, D/JX.135793 (Glamorgan).
Petty Officer William Whitehead, D/J.106211 (Devonport).
Petty Officer Alfred John William Williams, P/JX.140902.
Petty Officer Christopher Arthur Wood, LT/JX.224340 (Thornborough).
Temporary Petty Officer George Auckland, C/JX.279578 (York).
Temporary Petty Officer Leslie James Brown, P/JX.146405 (Portsmouth).
Temporary Petty Officer Walter William Dean, P/J.95765 (Poole).
Temporary Petty Officer David Lloyd Grimes, RCNVR, V.23126 (Westmount, Quebec).
Temporary Petty Officer Arthur John Horne, D/J.109448 (Exeter).
Temporary Petty Officer Albert Leonard Sheppard, P/J.100137 (Gosport).
Temporary Petty Officer Harold Thomas South, D/JX.152225 (Bridgewater, Shropshire).
Temporary Petty Officer (Coxswain) Isaac Edward Unthank, D/JX.155138 (Weymouth).
Temporary Petty Officer Leopold David White, D/J.95655 (Birkenhead).
Acting Petty Officer Robert Samuel Alexander Austin, D/SSX.27828 (South Shields).
Acting Petty Officer Harry Arthur Moore, P/MX.126298 (London).
Acting Petty Officer George Douglas Skinner, P/MX.635004 (Kirkcaldy).
Acting Petty Officer Herbert Henry James Wade, P/JX.274173 (Henley-on-Thames).
Temporary Acting Petty Officer Harold Stanley Alderson, D/JX.200336 (Manchester).
Temporary Acting Petty Officer Kenneth Ashworth, D/MD/X.3058 (Birkenhead).
Temporary Acting Petty Officer George Dickins, D/SSX.23389 (Sheffield).
Temporary Acting Petty Officer Frank Vincent Dickinson, D/SSX.27602 (Altrincham).
Temporary Acting Petty Officer John Elliot Grieve, P/JX.203189 (Glasgow).
Temporary Acting Petty Officer Jack William Loader, P/JX.161860.
Petty Officer Wireman Thomas Edmund Henry Butler, P/MX.66132 (Haverfordwest).
Petty Officer Wireman Leslie Richard Hines, P/MX.62276 (Kislingbury, Northants).
Yeoman of Signals Frank William Bridger, P/JX.144196 (Tynemouth).
Yeoman of Signals Frank Edward Hall, C/JX.139158 (Gillingham).
Yeoman of Signals Arthur Henry Koser, C/JX.132681 (Harrogate).
Yeoman of Signals Donald James Mathias, D/JX.152820 (Newbury).
Petty Officer Telegraphist Walter John Carro, D/JX.140200 (Barking, Essex).
Petty Officer Telegraphist George Edward Claridge, P/JX.151522 (Bishopsthorpe).
Petty Officer Telegraphist Robert Clarkson, D/JX.137574 (Wallsend-on-Tyne).
Petty Officer Telegraphist John Hubert Noone Curling, P/SSX.20807 (Reading).
Petty Officer Telegraphist Dennis Reginald Eagle, C/JX.139081 (Clacton-on-Sea).
Petty Officer Telegraphist Kenneth Ellison, D/JX.133229.
Petty Officer Telegraphist Ronald Cecil Victor Godley, P/JX.158221.
Petty Officer Telegraphist Frederick James Mitchell, D/JX.134074 (Smethwick).
Petty Officer Telegraphist Richard John Mitchell, C/J.95003.
Petty Officer Telegraphist Sydney Edward Pinington, C/JX.144970 (Faversham).
Petty Officer Telegraphist Herbert Quick, DSM, D/JX.138288 (The Lizard, Cornwall).
Temporary Petty Officer Telegraphist Frank John Dunk Capeling, C/J.100529 (Norbury).
Engine Room Artificer 4th Class Charles Walter Cofield, D/MX.64110 (Doncaster).
Engine Room Artificer 4th Class John Edward Crumpton, D/MX.75849 (Bristol).
Engine Room Artificer 4th Class David Charles Dennis, P/MX.78844.
Engine Room Artificer 4th Class David Joseph Philpot, P/MX.66022 (Luton).
Engine Room Artificer 4th Class Donald Tate, C/MX.97425 (East Ham).
Air Artificer 4th Class Henry John Cooper, FAA/FX.100651 (South Norwood).
Air Artificer 4th Class Tom Riding Littlewood, FAA/FX.77203 (Barnsley).
Air Artificer 4th Class Roy Lionel Swain, FAA/FX.79381 (Southampton).
Air Artificer 4th Class Eric Vincent, FAA/FX.81199 (Sherwood Rise, Notts.).
Electrical Artificer 4th Class Edward Barrett, C/MX.92198 (London).
Electrical Artificer 4th Class Arthur Edgar Lucas, P/MX.116684 (Poole).
Electrical Artificer 4th Class George Peat Morris, D/MX.71624.
Acting Electrical Artificer 4th Class James Hunter Allan, P/MX.503565 (Richarton, Kilmarnock).
Acting Electrical Artificer 4th Class Jack Hall, P/MX.500528 (Sheffield).
Acting Electrical Artificer 4th Class Alexander Taylor, C/MX.58916 (Peterhead, Aberdeen).
Acting Ordnance Artificer 4th Class Jack Redmond Keeley, C/MX.96219 (Kendal).
Stoker Petty Officer William Chares Bolch, P/KX.75804 (Lewes).
Stoker Petty Officer Albert Chalcraft, C/KX.78742 (East Molesey).
Stoker Petty Officer Thomas Douglas Francis Cross, C/KX.87782.
Stoker Petty Officer Charles Alfred George, C/KX.99532.
Stoker Petty Officer Joseph Norman Gould, D/KX.80473 (Burton-on-Trent).
Stoker Petty Officer Henry William Jacobs, C/K.47778 (Deal).
Stoker Petty Officer Thomas Henry Jeffery, P/KX 76380 (Littlehampton).
Stoker Petty Officer Walter Frederick Nunn, P/KX.78291 (Liverpool).
Stoker Petty Officer Matthew O'Neill, D/KX.86134 (Burnley).
Stoker Petty Officer William Raspin, C/K.17590 (Watford).
Stoker Petty Officer Joseph Robson, C/K.62509.
Stoker Petty Officer James Alfred Sams, P/KX.82237.
Stoker Petty Officer Ernest Walter Walker, C/K.22043.
Stoker Petty Officer Edward Waylett, C/K.13345.
Stoker Petty Officer Albert Edward Weller, D/K.63527.
Stoker Petty Officer Charles William Wise, C/KX.75123.
Stoker Petty Officer Leslie Wood, DSM, P/KX.83529 (Castleford, Yorks).
Temporary Acting Stoker Petty Officer Thomas Joseph Haldon Davies, D/KX.95354 (Devonport).
Petty Officer Motor Mechanic Thomas Hulme, P/MX.770&5.
Petty Officer Motor Mechanic Ronald Inger, P/MX.99401 (Nottingham).
Petty Officer Motor Mechanic Reginald Oscar Wilson Ives, P/MX.99402 (Woolwich).
Petty Officer Motor Mechanic Arthur Thomas Northcote, C/MX.116874.
Petty Officer Motor Mechanic Frederick Thomas Roberts, P/MX.79467 (Chepstow, Monmouth).
Petty Officer Ordnance Mechanic Reginald Stephen Tomlin, P/MX.116279.
Petty Officer Air Mechanic (E) Patrick Joseph Thomas McEvoy, FAA/FX.82724 (Dunblane).
Petty Officer Air Mechanic (E) Morgan Henry Williams, FAA/FX.80198 (Bere Ferrers, Devon).
Petty Officer Radio Mechanic Richard Ernest Charles Burford, D/MX.117249 (New Cross).
Petty Officer Radio Mechanic Dennis Sidney Thomas Lawler, P/MX.116318 (Harold Wood, Essex).
Petty Officer Radio Mechanic Donald Lund, FAA/FX.607228 (Middlesbrough).
Petty Officer Radio Mechanic William James Smith, P/MX.124373.
Temporary Petty Officer Radio Mechanic Cyril Rees Prosser, P/MX.116074 (Pengan).
Acting Petty Officer Radio Mechanic (W) Lawrence Walter Fozard, P/MX.125647 (London, E.12).
Acting Petty Officer Radio Mechanic Leonard Frederick Charles Shilham, P/MX.125448 (Pinner).
Engineman Edwin Atkinson, LT/KX.128064 (Hull).
Wartime Engineman Robert Broomhead, LT/KX.135913 (Grimsby).
Wartime Engineman John James Buck, LT/KX.104782 (Edinburgh).
Petty Officer Engineman William Arthur Canty, LT/KX.144352 (Harlow).
Petty Officer Engineman Jack Jacob Cotton, LT/KX.160104 (Freshwater, Isle of Wight).
Engineman Thomas William Harrison, LT/KX.131101 (Grimsby).
Engineman David Alfred Henrickson, LT/KX.124989 (Grimsby).
Engineman William Jappy, LT/X.422EU (Buckie).
Engineman Fred Kay, LT/KX.102435 (Coventry).
Engineman William Henry Lloyd, LT/X.75414 (St. Paul's Cray, Kent).
Engineman Robert Alfred McCarron, LT/KX.156101 (Liverpool).
Engineman John Reid, LT/KX.160095 (Avoch, Ross-shire).
Wartime Engineman Alfred Harry Sparkes, LT/KX.110497 (Reedham, Norfolk).
Engineman Edward Stephens, LT/KX.106203 (Manchester).
Engineman George Watson, LT/X.359EU (Lossiemouth).
Donkeyman Donald Ferguson, NAP/R.225131 (Glasgow).
Plumber Robert Ridler, NAP/R.197183.
Painter 1st Class Francis John Cecil Moore, D/MX.45044 (Weymouth).
Temporary Sick Berth Petty Officer Donald Edwin Grant, P/MX.52602 (Marlborough).
Temporary Sick Berth Petty Officer Sidney Redin, C/SBR.X.7747.
Petty Officer Writer Athelstan Leslie Sargeant, P/PD/X.52/Co (Oxford).
Temporary Petty Officer Writer John Malcolm Darwent, D/MX.81194 (Liverpool).
Stores Petty Officer William Glynda Burden, C/MX.63722.
Stores Petty Officer John Henry Denley, D/MX.47160 (St. Budeaux).
Stores Petty Officer Andrew Smith, P/MX.71603 (Aberdeen).
Temporary Stores Petty Officer Leonard Edward Dane Baskerville, C/KX.106470 (Twickenham).
Temporary Stores Petty Officer Douglas Frederick Ellis, P/MX.57916 (Slough).
Temporary Stores Petty Officer Ronald Edward Holt, C/CH/DX.87 (Ipswich).
Temporary Stores Petty Officer Frederick Charles Hooper, C/MX.80246 (Wellingborough).
Temporary Stores Petty Officer David Purdie, BEM, C/MX.72522 (Glasgow).
Temporary Stores Petty Officer William Thomas Treece, D/MX.57053 (Plymouth).
Petty Officer Cook (O) Ernest Gilbert Gill, D/L.14352.
Petty Officer Cook Henry Holdforth, P/MX.49831 (Portsmouth).
Petty Officer Cook (S) Charles James Phillips, C/MX.48410.
Petty Officer Cook (S) Albert Henry George White, P/MX.49045 (Portsmouth).
Temporary Petty Officer Cook (S) James Israel Balchin, P/MX.45020 (Portsmouth).
Temporary Petty Officer Cook William Alfred Crockett, C/MX.66592 (Aylesbury).
Temporary Petty Officer Cook (S) Albert Jennings, P/MX.46752.
Bandmaster 2nd Class Ernest George Margetts, R.M.B.3077 (Dorking).
Sergeant Godfrey Oswald Phillips, RM, Ch.X.715 (Bury St. Edmunds).
Corporal (Acting Temporary Sergeant) Arthur Henry Lindsay, RM, Po.X.2509 (Edgeworth).
Leading Seaman Bertram Elihu Bartlett, C/JX.181442.
Leading Seaman Archibald Herbert Bates, D/J.111081 (Hove).
Leading Seaman James Douglas Harold Beardmore, LT/JX.242123 (West Bromwich).
Wartime Leading Seaman George Henry Bullard, LT/JX.170613 (Fowey).
Leading Seaman William Couch, D/J.22662 (St. Budeaux).
Wartime Leading Seaman James Whyte Dawson, LT/JX.262005 (Kirriemuir).
Leading Seaman Charles George Edwards, LT/JX.222800.
Leading Seaman George Emerson, LT/JX.200853 (Scarborough).
Leading Seaman Arthur Robert King, P/JX.315885 (Walthamstow).
Leading Seaman William Henry Knight, LT/JX.206548 (Chatham).
Leading Seaman John Henry David Harris, LT/JX.225795.
Leading Seaman James Thornton Hart, LT/JX.180451 (Gravesend).
Leading Seaman Trevor James Hayes, D/SSX.27573 (Swansea).
Leading Seaman George Leiper, LT/JX.219464 (Aberdeen).
Wartime Leading Seaman Sidney Lewis, LT/JX.181784 (Hull).
Leading Seaman George Lofthouse, P/J.24129 (Hounslow).
Wartime Leading Seaman William MacFarlane, LT/JX.280235 (Tarbert, Argyll).
Leading Seaman Donald MacLennan, LT/JX.265162 (Stornoway).
Leading Seaman John Geddes Murray, LT/JX.177021 (Buckle).
Leading Seaman James Murray, LT/JX.20828 (Buckie).
Leading Seaman Reginald Henry Menyena, D/JX.145329 (Edinburgh).
Leading Seaman Patrick Terence O'Connor, LT/JX.190066 (Exeter).
Leading Seaman Jack Thompson Palmer, D/J.111567 (Birmingham).
Leading Seaman Walter Leonard Flatten, LT/JX.170553 (Hull).
Leading Seaman Frederick George Rackham, LT/JX.225167 (Grimsby).
Leading Seaman Alexander Reid, LT/JX.265444 (Macduff).
Leading Seaman Daniel Robertson, D/J.84476 (Bere Alston).
Leading Seaman Ronald Taylor, P/JX.169661 (Worthing).
Leading Seaman Dennis John Gordon Tillet, P/JX.271617 (London, S.E.17).
Wartime Leading Seaman Sydney Arthur Whelpton, LT/JX.229398 (Grimsby).
Temporary Leading Seaman Joseph Colquhoun, P/JX.289662 (Kilniarnock).
Temporary Leading Seaman Harry Walter Emerson, C/JX.195335.
Temporary Leading Seaman Richard Alfred Hellens, LT/JX.278578.
Temporary Leading Seaman Alexander Francis Kydd, P/JX.278189.
Acting Leading Seaman Ronald Victor Batten, D/JX.159715 (Exeter).
Acting Leading Seaman (Coxswain) Eric Hindley, P/SR.8721 (Hull).
Acting Leading Seaman Frank Surplice, D/JX.131296 (Birmingham).
Temporary Acting Leading Seaman David William Appleton, D/JX.250078 (Par, Cornwall).
Temporary Acting Leading Seaman Alfred Eric Victor Aplin, P/SSX.26289 (St. John's, Newfoundland).
Temporary Acting Leading Seaman Harold Edward Boulding, C/JX.212141 (Kennington).
Temporary Acting Leading Seaman James Burke, C/JX.247788 (Manchester).
Temporary Acting Leading Seaman Robert Calvert, D/JX.192975 (Preston).
Temporary Acting Leading Seaman James William Clark, C/JX.216608 (Highbury).
Temporary Acting Leading Seaman Harold Cracknell, D/JX.265739 (Wiston, Yorks).
Temporary Acting Leading Seaman Arthur Stanley Cressy, C/JX.239490 (Southall).
Temporary Acting Leading Seaman Clarence Albert Davis, P/JX.224071 (Rothwell).
Temporary Acting Leading Seaman William Duckworth, C/JX.226873 (Nottingham).
Temporary Acting Leading Seaman Thomas William Jackson, P/JX.176333.
Temporary Acting Leading Seaman William McLeod, P/CDX.2955 (Glasgow).
Temporary Acting Leading Seaman Daniel Murren, C/JX.169651 (Glasgow).
Temporary Acting Leading Seaman James Francis Orr, P/SSX.25280 (Manchester).
Temporary Acting Leading Seaman Walter Thomas Ovenden, C/JX.212290 (Tipton, Staffs).
Temporary Acting Leading Seaman Frederick Ronald Platt, P/JX.384654.
Temporary Acting Leading Seaman Bernard Joseph Swift, D/JX.214353 (Liverpool).
Temporary Acting Leading Seaman Reginald Herbert Waller, C/JX.204113 (Edmonton).
Temporary Acting Leading Seaman Walter James White, P/JX.326595 (London).
Temporary Acting Leading Seaman Reginald Charles Henry Whitehead, D/J.101782 (Bridgwater).
Leading Wireman Richard Bird, C/MX.92320 (Edinburgh).
Leading Wireman Leslie Bowden, C/MX.118360 (Manchester).
Leading Wireman Jack Nathan Brayshaw, C/MX.69268 (Wanstead).
Leading Wireman Kenneth Roy Gammons, C/MX.90782.
Leading Wireman Arthur William Gibbs, C/MX.96916 (Hayes).
Leading Wireman Gwilym Jones, D/MX.103431.
Leading Wireman Cecil William Alfred Leech, C/MX.77413 (Ilford).
Leading Signalman William Cox, C/JX.143573 (Gorleston-on-Sea).
Leading Signalman Lyn Holbrook, C/JX.169993 (Southend-on-Sea).
Leading Signalman John Septimus Strand, C/SSX.25678 (Hebburn-on-Tyne).
Leading Signalman Edward Weir, D/J.112219 (Liverpool).
Leading Signalman Alfred William Woodcock, C/JX.232599 (Westcliff-on-Sea).
Leading Telegraphist Frank Ellis, D/J.54056 (Torquay).
Leading Telegraphist Gordon Roland Short, P/JX.142830 (Portsmouth).
Leading Telegraphist Michael Henry Murphy, D/JX.150100 (Rosyth).
Leading Telegraphist Eric Clifford Pattimore, P/SSX.33333 (Guernsey).
Leading Telegraphist James Huitson Sproates, C/JX.153040 (Blackball Colliery, Durham).
Temporary Leading Telegraphist George Wilson Downs, P/SSX.31382 (Sunderland).
Temporary Leading Telegraphist Ronald Victor Parsons, C/JX.143925 (Gillingham).
Temporary Leading Telegraphist Stanley Cyril Wareham, P/JX.171871 (London).
Acting Leading Telegraphist William Simmons, RCNVR. V.26082 (Victoria, B.C.).
Leading Coder Peter John Lay, D/JX.356007 (London, S.E.8).
Temporary Leading Coder Derek Summers Carr, D/JX.293373 (Dudley, Worcs.).
Leading Stoker Clifford Henry Allen, P/KX.97481 (Runcorn).
Leading Stoker William Henry Harvey, D/KX.98294 (Salcombe).
Leading Stoker William Verdun Llewellyn, P/KX.107456 (Goodwick, Pembs.).
Leading Stoker Ronald McAdam, D/KX.118453 (Liverpool).
Leading Stoker Lloyd Angus Martin, RCNVR. V.1603 (Hopefield, P.E.I.).
Leading Stoker Daniel Murphy, D/KX.80644.
Leading Stoker John Quinn, P/K.66906.
Wartime Leading Stoker Frederick Ward, LT/KX.136044 (Middlesbrough).
Leading Stoker Raymond Victor Wildgoose, D/KX.97580 (Bristol).
Temporary Leading Stoker Herbert Daley, D/KX.97502 (Burnley).
Temporary Leading Stoker Trevor Jones, D/KX.81496 (Wrexham).
Temporary Leading Stoker James Arthur Worboyds, P/KX.100727.
Temporary Acting Leading Stoker Colin Harold Daniel Hobbs, D/KX.104212 (Stourbridge, Glos.).
Acting Temporary Leading Stoker Alexander Kilpatrick, C/KX.120870 (Irvine, Ayrshire).
Temporary Acting Leading Stoker John Robert Simpson, D/SS.118989 (Melnathorpe, Kinross-shire).
Temporary Acting Leading Stoker James Silvester Strick, D/K.66266 (Madron Heamoor, Cornwall).
Electrical Mechanic 5th Class Jonathan William Bennett, C/MX.95646 (Kendal).
Leading Motor Mechanic Kenneth Mundy, C/MX.501196.
Acting Temporary Leading Air Mechanic (A) Robert Hill, FAA/FX.90006 (Castleford, Yorks.).
Temporary Leading Air Mechanic (A) Alfred Eric Dolling, FAA/FX.93939 (Chesterfield).
Acting Leading Air Mechanic William John Willett, FAA/SFX.2757 (Coventry).
Leading Radio Mechanic Ralph Taylor Bog, P/MX.572435.
Blacksmith 4th Class Patrick Harold Garrett, D/MX.90988 (Millbrook).
Leading Writer Arthur Spedding Lowe, C/MX.70945 (Atherton).
Temporary Leading Writer Percy Cyril Squires, P/MX.80369 (Hazelgrove, near Stockport).
Leading Stores Assistant John Bernard Stiles, D/MX.82705 (Kettering).
Leading Cook John Harris Davies, D/MX.73180 (Spennymoor).
Leading Cook (S) Frank Alfred Ellis, P/MX.94888 (Cleckheaton, Yorks).
Leading Cook (S) Norman Hale, D/MX.80899 (New Eltham).
Leading Cook Arthur Lawrence, LT/MX.85225 (London).
Leading Cook Percy William Woodsford, D/MX.64303 (Alton Pancras).
Leading Steward John Louis Davidson, LT/LX.32097 (Newcastle).
Leading Steward John Penrose, P/LX.25497 (London).
Temporary Leading Steward Leslie Walker, D/LX.26065 (Mansfield).
Temporary Leading Steward William David Aitken, D/LX.24981.
Greaser George William White, NAP/R.118582 (Southampton).
Diesel Greaser Harry William Arthur Fowles, NAP/R.29339 (Southampton).
Corporal (Temporary) William Henry Honey, RM, Po.X.103167 (London).
Junior Electrician Bernard Leslie Banfield, NAP/R.293899 (Ashingdon, Essex).
Acting Able Seaman William Ernest George Abramson, P/JX.268467 (Oxford).
Acting Able Seaman Frederick George Adams, C/JX.235760 (Leiston, Suffolk).
Able Seaman Ronald Arrowsmith, C/JX.236932 (Park Gate, Cheshire).
Able Seaman Harold Frederick Blackwell, D/JX.189115 (Gravesend).
Acting Able Seaman Joseph Boyes, D/JX.249141 (Manchester).
Able Seaman Henry Buckley, D/JX.365204 (Birkenhead).
Able Seaman Robert Darrock Campbell, C/JX.235306 (Glasgow).
Acting Able Seaman Benjamin William Cannell, C/JX.265653 (Chingford).
Able Seaman Robert Bell Christian, D/JX.184252 (Port Erin, Isle of Man).
Able Seaman Frederick Williams Collins, C/J.108166.
Acting Able Seaman George Arthur Collins, P/JX.289177 (Birmingham).
Acting Able Seaman Leslie Douglas Coulter, C/SR.148 (Chatham).
Acting Able Seaman Harry Storey Cresswell, P/JX.236664 (Leeds).
Acting Able Seaman Selwyn Dobbs, D/JX.289583 (Neath).
Acting Able Seaman Donald Dumbreck, D/JX.349280 (Glasgow).
Acting Able Seaman Albert Henry Eaton, D/JX.255222.
Able Seaman Frank Joseph Fletcher, C/JX.317962 (Sheffield).
Able Seaman John Kenneth Fletcher, P/SSX.28640 (Saltburn).
Able Seaman Claud Bertram Fry, D/JX.257414 (Sanderstead).
Able Seaman Arthur Edward Fullick, P/JX.325283 (London, S.W.6).
Able Seaman Henry Edward Hammill, D/JX.364976 (Glasgow).
Able Seaman Jolhn Thomas Hart, P/JX.384758 (Rotherham).
Able Seaman Frank Stanyer Hewlett, P/JX.276494 (Pluckley, Kent).
Able Seaman Cecil Reginald Higgins, D/J.70884 (Plymouth).
Acting Able Seaman Ernest Hill, P/JX.265916 (Barnsley).
Able Seaman Cyril Holt, D/JX.284697 (Haywood, Lanes.).
Acting Able Seaman George Henry Hudson, P/JX.263659 (Brockley, S.E.).
Able Seaman Frederick Eves, C/JX.398369 (London).
Able Seaman Austin James Janes, P/JX.208915 (Noggy Bay, Newfoundland).
Able Seaman Walter George Law, D/JX.185016.
Able Seaman Douglas Lewis, D/JX.239134 (Warrington).
Able Seaman Percy Ronald Lowry, P/JX.383240 (Leeds).
Able Seaman William Walter Luxton, D/JX.153983 (Bangor, Northern Ireland).
Able Seaman William Thomas Moppett, P/J.95705 (Brighton).
Able Seaman Arthur Albert Murray, C/JX.300998 (Catford).
Able Seaman William Ronald Newsum, P/JX.247745 (Long Eaton).
Able Seaman Leonard Richard Northam, D/J.93153 (Bringhome, Yorks.).
Able Seaman Kenneth Frederick Poole, P/JX.324188 (Wolstanton).
Able Seaman William Sidney Ernest Pearce, C/JX.542200 (Harrow).
Able Seaman Joseph Pellington, P/JX.516036 (Newcastle-under-Lyme).
Able Seaman Eric Penkethman, C/JX.204447 (Manchester).
Able Seaman Robert Pye, D/JX.345971 (St. Helens).
Acting Able Seaman Herbert William Rampling, C/JX.37444 (Ipswich).
Acting Able Seaman Wilfred George Reynolds, P/JX.289152 (Seven Kings).
Acting Able Seaman Arthur Robinson, C/JX.255446 (Hucknall, Notts.).
Able Seaman Geoffrey Venables Rowland, C/JX.240171 (Stroud).
Acting Able Seaman James Ross, C/JX.291840 (Bowness).
Able Seaman Clifford Wright Scott, P/JX.282724 (Halifax).
Able Seaman Lawrence Scott, RCNVR. V.10747 (Regina, Sask.).
Able Seaman Norman Scholes, C/JX.260875 (Manchester).
Able Seaman William Ross Sutherland, D/JX.257688 (Aberdeen).
Able Seaman Alec Tate, D/JX.420465 (Coventry).
Able Seaman Arthur Douglas Twort, C/JX.203373 (London, S.E.11).
Able Seaman Frederick Varty, D/JX.203104 (Alston, Cumberland).
Able Seaman Harold George Venney, D/JX.255702 (Ely).
Able Seaman Arthur Wheatley, P/J.99162.
Able Seaman Percy Harold Whitehand, C/JX.147885.
Wireman John Glyngwyn Jones, C/MX.68706 (London).
Signalman Roy Edward Batchelor, P/JX.308340 (Edmonton).
Signalman Alan George Froude, C/JX.573663 (Hemsworth, near Pontefract).
Signalman Alfred Norman Hale, P/JX.278264.
Signalman Leonard Hart, D/JX.203009.
Signalman Daniel Lewis, P/JX.380893 (Downham, Kent).
Signalman Allan James Swadkin, LT/JX.340205 (Sutton Coldfield).
Signalman Victor Yates, P/JX.322594 (Chorley).
Telegraphist Douglas Donaldson, P/JX.454006 (Edinburgh).
Telegraphist Andrew Hall, P/JX.204059 (Wellington Quay, Northumberland).
Telegraphist Jack McLean Harper, LT/JX.331161 (Johnstone, Renfrewshire).
Coder William Henry Bell, D/JX.615479 (Liverpool).
Coder Percival Albert Birch, D/JX.207642 (Totnes).
Coder Alec James Farquhar, P/JX.293800 (Sheffield).
Coder Joseph Henry Gill, D/JX.272342 (Easingwold, Yorks.).
Coder Dennis Hargreaves, D/JX.230281 (Colne).
Stoker 1st Class Maurice Auburn, C/KX.154491 (Hitchin).
Stoker 1st Class James Collins, D/KX.525129 (Galston, Ayrshire).
Stoker 1st Class Frederick Sidney Arthur Buckland, C/KX.135196 (Potter's Bar).
Stoker 1st Class David Adam Glen, C/KX.159133 (Bridgeton).
Stoker 1st Class John Branford Hall, C/KX.127815.
Stoker 1st Class Cyril Holmes, P/KX.101325 (Huddersfield).
Stoker 1st Class George Edward Keal, LT/KX.131424 (Hull).
Stoker 1st Class Henry James Levis, D/K.57931 (Skibbereen, Co. Cork).
Stoker 1st Class Thomas McRae, R/300421 (Aberdeen).
Stoker 1st Class Henry Thomas Roberts, P/KX.130148 (Hanwell).
Stoker 1st Class Harold Scott, D/KX.121666 (Bath).
Stoker 1st Class Sydney Thomas Sheath, P/KX.85705 (Southampton).
Stoker 1st Class Herbert Stokes, P.64041 (Tisbury, Wilts.).
Sick Berth Attendant Francis Patrick Armitage, P/MX.112379 (Huddersfield).
Sick Berth Attendant Kenneth Blakemore, D/MX.100511 (Manchester).
Writer Donald McKoy, C/CH/DX/40 (Gillingham).
First Writer Hugh Robertson Ross, NAP/R.225390.
Marine Gordon Edwin Hibberd, RM, Po.X.3855 (Portsmouth).
Marine Walter Stanley Rose, RM, Ply.X.106563. L.C.S.(L)259.
Ordinary Seaman Robert Douglas Barber, R/300344 (Maidstone).
Ordinary Seaman Joseph Mostyn, P/JX.633726 (London, N.12).
Ordinary Seaman John Pearson, D/JX.650133 (Hexham).
Seaman Frank Bott, LT/JX.409945 (Chatham).
Seaman Matthew Cecil Gumming, LT/JX.529382 (Shetland).
Seaman William Endean, LT/JX.303108 (Potters Bar).
Seaman Horace Hatch, LT/JX.173190 (Hull).
Seaman Sylvester Hickey, LT/JX.662475.
Seaman James Henry Herbert Knight, LT/JX.229253 (Romford).
Seaman Robert Lees, LT/JX.514100 (Kelso).
Seaman Joseph Macguirk, LT/JX.196123 (Annie Pit).
Seaman Murdo Mackenzie, LT/X.80150 (Stomoway).
Seaman Frank Margerison, LT/JX.321050 (Brampton).
Seaman Wilfred Jack Mitchell, LT/JX.219665 (Cleethorpes).
Seaman Henry Frederick Newberry, LT/JX.195967 (Lowestoft).
Seaman James Richmond, LT/JX.202632 (Preston).
Seaman George Joiner Ritchie, LT/JX.177013 (Whitehill, Banff).
Seaman Peter Kenneth Wallace Setch, LT/JX.317226 (London, E.12).
Seaman Stanley Smethurst, LT/JX.205502 (Swinton).
Seaman Henry Edmund Stockwell, LT/JX.319185 (Acton).
Seaman Samuel William Taylor, LT/JX.202198 (Wells-on-Sea).

Mention in Despatches (Posthumous)
Leading Steward Albert Edward Riches, LT/LX.27771 (Great Yarmouth).

Royal Air Force
 Acting Air Marshal
R. V. Goddard, CB, CBE.

 Air Vice-Marshals

R. S. Aitken, CBE, MC, AFC.
J. W. Baker, CB, MC, DFC.
B. McEntegart, CB, CBE.
A. P. M. Sanders, CB, CBE.

 Air Commodores

V. B. Bennett, DFC.
J. A. Boret, CBE, MC, AFC.
J. M. Mason, DFC, DSC.
H. N. Thornton, MBE.
F. N. Trinder, CBE.

 Acting Air Commodores

C. E. Benson.
R. A. Chisholm, DSO, DFC.
C. W. Dicken.
J. H. Edwardes-Jones, CBE, DFC, AFC.
H. E. Fenton, DSO, DFC.
N. H. Fresson, DFC.
A. J. W. Geddes, DSO, OBE.
H. D. Jackman, CBE.
D. W. Lane.
F. B. Ludlow, CBE, MC.
F. J. Murphy.
A. W. B. McDonald, AFC.
L. T. Pankhurst, CBE.
F. L. Pearce, DSO, DFC.
R. L. Phillips.
J. R. Hallings-Pott, DSO, AFC.
L. F. Sinclair, GC, CBE, DSO, ADC.
R. N. Watte.

 Group Captains

G. N. Amison.
P. W. Bale.
F. E. P. Barrington.
E. C. Bates, AFC.
C. E. St. J. Beamish, DFC.
A. J. Biggar.
L. W. C. Bower, DFC.
F. J. St. G. Braithwaite, OBE.
E. J. P. Burling, DSC, DFC, AFC.
A. E. Case, RAFO.
H. H. Chapman.
M. V. M. Clube, AAF.
L. Crocker.
E. J. P. Davy.
H. R. A. Edwards, DFC, AFC.
K. H. R. Elliot, DSO.
H. A. Evans-Evans.
B. G. Farrow, OBE.
E. S. Finch.
C. E. Foster, RAFVR.
T. P. Cleave, CBE.
Lord G. N. Douglas-Hamilton, OBE, AFC.
P. I. Harris, DFC.
J. G. Hawtrey, ADC.
E. A. Healy.
C. M. Heard.
M. L. Heath.
G. F. W. Heycock, DFC.
H. E. Hills, OBE, AAF.
J. W. Hunt.
J. M. D. Ker.
W. H. Kyle, DFC.
R. H. A. Leigh.
J. A. H. Louden.
J. A. McDonald.
J. D. Miller.
R. J. P. Morris.
C. G. J. Micolls, MB, BCh.
F. E. Nuttall, OBE.
M. D. Ommanney.
W. E. Oulton, DSO, DFC.
J. T. Paine.
H. M. G. Parker.
I. R. Parker, AAF.
K. F. T. Pickles.
J. H. Powle.
G. H. Russell, DFC.
A. V. Sawyer, DFC.
R. H. Scott, AAF.
J. H. Searby, DSO, DFC.
J. B. Selby, DSO, DFC, RAFVR.
G. Shaw, DFC, AAF.
F. J. Sherman, RAFVR.
J. C. Sisson, DFC, RAFO.
V. R. Smith.
J. E. R. Sowman.
M. T. Spence, RAFVR.
J. E. G. Thomas, DFC.
J. M. Thompson, DSO, DFC.
J. Warburton.
E. R. Wood.
A. B. Woodhall, OBE.
B. C. Yarde.

 Honorary Group Captain
W. S. Allen, RAFVR.

 Acting Group Captains

H. M. Baker, BEM.
P. G. Wykeham-Barnes, DSO, DFC.
J. C. Barraclough, RAFO.
A. H. Boyd, DSO, DFC, RAFO.
H. P. Broad, DFC.
C. Broughton.
A. C. Brown, DSO, DFC.
E. N. Clifton, RAFVR.
A. E. Clouston, DSO, DFC, AFC.
R. M. Coad, AFC, RAFO.
K. R. Coates.
T. C. Dickens.
G. E. Gordon-Duff.
C. S. Ellison.
V. Fairfield.
G. R. Scott-Farnie, RAFVR.
G. A. C. Foster, DFC, AFC.
L. Freeman.
T. M. Horgan, DSO, DFC.
G. F. Humphries, RAFO.
L. A. Jackson, OBE.
P. G. Jameson, DSO, DFC, RAFO.
E. J. A. Knight.
G. V. Lane, DFC, AFC, RAFO.
C. W. M. Ling, DFC.
J. C. E. Luard, RAFVR.
D. S. MacDonald, DFC.
J. McLaren, RAFVR.
W. D. McPherson, OBE, RAFVR.
T. G. Mapplebeck, RAFVR.
S. J. Marchbank, DFC.
W. R. Mayes, OBE, DSM, AFM.
E. G. L. Millington, DFC.
S. H. E. Mitchell, OBE.
V. R. Moon, AFC, RAFO.
P. B. B. Ogilvie, DSO, DFC.
A. B. Olney.
G. J. C. Paul, DFC.
C. W. Pollock, RAFVR.
T. G. E. Price, RAFO.
P. J. A. Riddell.
H. R. McL. Reid, DFC.
B. Robinson.
A. M. Rodgers.
C. F. Sarsby.
A. G. Stratford-Tuke.
D. A. W. Sugden, OBE.
G. C. Tomlinson, OBE, DFC.
C. Turl, OBE, DSM.
B. A. Vautier.
E. G. Campbell-Voullaire, DFC, RAFO.
R. G. Warden, RAFVR.
S. G. Wise, DFC, RAFO.

 Wing Commanders

A. W. Alberry, MBE (35217).
A. K. Allen (83141), RAFVR.
C. C. Barker (23304), RAFO.
B. Barthoed (33218).
G. C. C. Bartlett, AFC (39022), RAFO.
E. A. Biddle (21190).
J. Black (85807), RAFVR.
B. H. Boon (36045).
I. H. Bowhill (77818), RAFVR.
H. E. Brushwood, OBE (35059).
F. E. Burton, DFC (37623), RAFO.
C. A. Butler (37711).
F. G. Carle (31072).
B. Chadwell (21168).
A. R. T. Coke (28216).
A. E. Connolly (21099), RAFO.
F. A. Coombs (43485), RAFVR.
L. Davey (35101).
P. W. A. Dudgeon (70934), RAFO.
E. C. Durbin, MBE (28018), RAFVR.
A. E. Eaton, DSO (75004), RAFVR.
M. H. de L. Everest (34192), RAFO.
J. N. W. Farmer, DFC (37316).
A. N. Francombe (18210), RAFO.
J. F. Fraser, DFC (70229), RAFVR.
W. H. Geddes (35266).
F. P. Gee (31149).
W. B. W. Gracey (90020), AAF.
D. H. M. Graham (31061).
F. G. Hammond (35003), RAFO.
A. J. Handley (39731), RAFO.
G. H. Harrison (35093).
M. C. Hassell, OBE, MC (90437), AAF.
F. C. Hayward (21206).
W. Higgs (31479).
R. Hollingworth (75615), RAFVR.
C. C. Howes (35198).
F. W. Hudson (35366).
F. W. Jenkins (35045).
L. F. Jennings (43447), RAFVR.
H. K. King (87132) RAFVR.
W. H. King, OBE (35034).
C. D. Layers, MBE (39118), RAFO.
J. W. Martin (75181), RAFVR.
L. G. Martin (22200), RAFO.
L. Mathias (33270).
D. Michell (33008).
C. M. H. Outram (29247), RAFO.
W. D. Peock (90365), AAF.
E. F. Pippet (37119), RAFO.
A. A. Quayle (21060).
W. H. Rayner (77951), RAFVR.
G. Robinson (31303).
J. P. Scorgie, BEM (31189).
J. Simpson (114909), RAFVR.
D. G. Smith (23299).
L. Spencer (35137).
H. W. C. Springham (31033).
W. G. Swanborough, MBE (35008).
J. C. Taylor (23323).
H. J. A. Thewles (37836), RAFO.
A. C. Thorne (31113).
P. S. Vallis (35348).
J. G. Walser, MC (08171).
L. A. Wear (31188).
T. Wilson (35048).
T. A. K. Wilson (71401), RAFO.
J. W. Woolcock (90307), AAF.

 Honorary Wing Commander
M. Graham, RAFVR.

 Chaplain
The Rev. K. V. Ensor, RAFVR.

 Acting Wing Commanders

J. C. S. Ahern (72597), RAFVR.
G. M. Allcock, DFC (36215), RAFO.
C. F. Atkinson (33205).
G. Baker (11020), RAFVR.
S. Barr (72181), RAFVR.
L. H. Bartlett, DSO (102959), RAFVR.
H. R. M. Beall (39161).
H. D. Bisley, AFC (43057).
F. B. Blinkhorn (88758), RAFVR.
G. A. Bone (43876).
H. L. Bosworth (79076), RAFVR.
J. A. T. Bowen (44613).
T. Bradley (45530).
E. A. Bradly (74592), RAFVR.
E. R. Butcher (44642).
R. W. Caeser (44579).
J. R. Canham, DFC (40799), RAFO.
R. R. Chapman (44863).
H. J. Barton-Chapple (76081), RAFVR.
E. C. Chesterton (75863), RAFVR.
H. Clarke (43441).
F. K. R. Coldstream (90701), AAF.
F. H. Collingridge (110593), RAFVR.
C. H. Collins (43733).
W. M. Collins, DFC (43848).
J. B. Conolly (31154).
W. C. E. Craig, DFC (46341).
T. D. Craven (90094), AAF.
A. W. Crouchley (76376), RAFVR.
H. V. Crowder (19212), RAFO.
A. E. Dale, DFM (35232).
A. W. Daniels (35022).
D. J. Dawson (23310).
M. D. Day (39413), RAFO.
E. W. Deacon, DSO, DFC (44547).
M. J. P. De Froberville (72358), RAFVR.
D. J. Devitt (39434) RAFO.
A. N. Dixon (84575), RAFVR.
T. E. Dixon (104673), RAFVR.
G. W. Dodds (44889).
D. A. Doughty (72275), RAFVR.
E. Earnshaw (101151), RAFVR.
A. H. Edwards (72213), RAFVR.
L. B. Ercolani, DSO (62270), RAFVR.
P. C. P. Farnes, DFM (88437), RAFVR.
D. I. Farquharson (75936), RAFVR.
J. S. Farquharson (73757), RAFVR.
A. G. C. Farrar (79024), RAFVR.
R. A. Field (39277).
F. G. Ferrier (24089), RAFO.
F. J. K. Fleetwood (39380).
L. J. Fletcher (74502), RAFVR.
G. V. Forrest (109482), RAFVR.
A. J. E. Forsyth (72833), RAFVR.
E. W. Franklin (31492).
R. E. Fraser (43728).
M. M. Gardham (21328), RAFO.
A. C. Gilmer (75495), RAFVR.
Sir R. B. Graham (79643), RAFVR.
E. F. Hales (43906).
J. K. Hankinson (72848), RAFVR.
J. F. H. Hargrave (74927), RAFO.
E. R. Harley (81964), RAFVR.
G. H. Harris (75779), RAFVR.
G. Henderson (90045), AAF.
R. C. Henry (43650).
W. H. Herbert, MBE (44490).
C. Hill, MC (85179), RAFVR.
F. F. Howard (86159), RAFVR.
C. Howells (44083).
A. M. D. Howes (22194), RAFVR.
H. J. Hyde (46065).
L. L. Ingram (23339).
C. G. James (77391), RAFVR.
D. M. Jannaway (31279).
J. Jewell (43392).
H. A. S. Johnston, DFC (88723), RAFVR.
S. H. Jordan, MBE (44839).
B. L. Kearley (61127), RAFVR.
G. T. Kelsey (83121), RAFVR.
F. K. Kennedy (75016), RAFVR.
W. R. A. Knocker (74333), RAFVR.
J. H. Kynoch, DFC (40232).
J. K. Lancaster (85904), RAFVR.
H. M. Langley (81771), RAFVR.
W. S. L. Lapidge (43386).
J. N. C. Law (80590), RAFVR.
H. R. Lawson, DFC, AFC (43121).
J. A. Lennox (78219), RAFVR.
F. Lord (43503).
K. J. McDonald, DFC (39097),RAFO.
F. V. MacLaine (23333).
W. C. McNeil (22048), RAFO.
W. McMenemy (87094), RAFVR.
F. Mattar (107498), RAFVR.
H. P. Matthews, OBE, BEM (43860).
H. W. Merckel (86168), RAFVR.
A. E. Miller (43585).
W. E. Moss (47242).
A. E. Munson (149651), RAFVR.
J. W. New (18010).
C. N. Foxley Norris (70225), RAFVR.
E. F. J. Odoire, DFC, AFC (43139).
E. C. Ormonde (75643), RAFVR.
F. W. Palmer, VC, MM (87556), RAFVR.
G. W. Petre, DFC (33353).
D. B. Pinkney (76240), RAFVR.
O. Plowright (102271), RAFVR.
E. Plumtree, DFC (83716), RAFVR.
A. M. R. Ramsden (44728).
D. A. Reddick, DFC, AFC (43522).
D. K. Redford (73049), RAFVR.
K. B. Redmond (23385), RAFO.
K. C. Roberts (70817), RAFO.
J. L. Roche (23361), RAFO.
J. R. S. Romanes, DFC (39202), RAFO.
A. H. Rook, DFC, AFC (90071), AAF.
D. C. Sandeman, DFC (81052), RAFVR.
A. H. R. Sellar (79597), RAFVR.
E. G. Sewell (89969), RAFVR.
J. H. Sindall (37365), RAFO.
A. E. Slocombe (40323), RAFO.
F. V. Smith (79818), RAFVR.
R. F. Fleming-Smith (84562), RAFVR.
G. M. Somers (44321).
J. N. Stagey, DFC (41217), RAFO.
T. N. Stack (33455).
E. E. Stammers (76057), RAFVR.
E. A. Starling (70643), RAFO.
D. W. Steventon, DSO, DFC (33477).
A. C. Stewart, DFC (40151), RAFO.
W. R. N. Sturdy, DFC (42906), RAFO.
F. B. Sumerling (23097), RAFO.
P. J. Sykes (82432), RAFVR.
W. D. Symes (31248).
E. D. Syson (78342), RAFVR.
J. Scott-Taggart, MC (73518), RAFVR.
L. W. Tee, MBE (44142).
T. W. J. Temple (79421), RAFVR.
W. A. H. Thomas (44393).
H. Thompson, MBE (43438).
W. J. C. Tonge (78364), RAFVR.
M. A. Toomey (119082), RAFVR.
S. E. Townson (46179).
T. A. Trotter (41082), RAFO.
J. C. Vickery (79017), RAFVR.
T. A. Vigors, DFC (33554)
W. Walster (45048).
T. H. C. Wardlaw (88754), RAFVR.
G. H. Wass (76383), RAFVR.
P. H. Watts, DSO, DFC (43371).
D. A. Watson (70715), RAF Regiment.
P. H. Way, DFC (39645), RAFO.
W. H. Westgate, MBE (44275).
H. C. Westwood (44215).
G. H. Wherry, DFC (39624), RAFO.
A. E. White (73670) RAFVR.
P. A. Wilkinson (23326), RAFO.
A. Williams (72433), RAFVR.
A. G. Wilson, DFC (70831), RAFO.
E. C. Wolfe, DFC (37705), RAFO.
J. P. M. Woolley (37489).
H. L. Wright (132239), RAFVR.
J. F. Wright (76947), RAFVR.

 Squadron Leaders

F. W. G. Aggett, MBE (35038).
D. M. Alexander (131864), RAFVR.
J. F. Alexander (85654), RAFVR.
J. H. C. Albrecht (90345), AAF.
R. F. Arnold (43586).
J. Baines (86498), RAFVR.
A. H. W. Ball, DSO, DFC (33532).
W. E. Ballard (90599), AAF.
J. F. R. Barker (69532), RAFVR.
C. P. Bennett (90992), AAF.
D. A. Berkett (21320), RAFO.
N. Booth (75110), RAFVR.
K. G. Brabner (79443), RAFVR.
J. N. Britton (81759), RAFVR.
R. Brown (45685).
L. F. Bruce (108590), RAFVR.
B. J. Bugden (66115), RAFVR.
F. H. Bugge, AFC (08241), RAFO.
E. R. Butler, DFC (108923), RAFVR.
N. V. Carter (31425).
J. G. Cave (39271).
E. Chambers (132210), RAFVR.
J. W. Chance (79652), RAFVR.
M. A. Chappell (75275), RAFVR.
M. R. Chassels (77090), RAFVR.
W. Clarke (70132), RAFVR.
G. P. Collier (74457), RAFVR.
C. J. Collins (44466).
V. R. V. Cooper (90367), AAF.
F. W. J. Cottrell (118014), RAFVR.
W. A. Covill (21294), RAFO.
L. E. Crawley (74461), RAFVR.
A. P. Crowley (45285).
S. E. T. Cusdin (85456), RAFVR.
H. Cutter (43445).
W. C. P. Dale (72641), RAFVR.
H. A. Daniell (75527), RAFVR.
G. A. Darlow (73948), RAFVR.
E. G. Done (102689), RAFVR.
D. L. Doyle (77152), RAFVR.
C. P. Drake (140001), RAFVR.
K. M. Dunsford (83348), RAFVR.
H. Edge (73812), RAFVR.
J. S. Ellard (79014), RAFVR.
M. O. F. England (73813), RAFVR.
L. S. N. B. Faulkner, OBE (75937), RAFVR.
F. G. Foot (40902).
W. R. Foreman (23381), RAFO.
W. M. S. Fox (90561), AAF.
F. J. Frost (71325), RAFO.
H. P. Game, AFC (74886), RAFO.
W. T. Garratt (118291), RAF Regiment.
P. B. Gilbert (45237).
R. G. Goodfellow (78151), RAFVR.
A. P. Gorrie (78514), RAFVR.
S. G. Grainger (46681).
E. A. Grant (73879), RAFVR.
C. E. Gregory (73207), RAFVR.
T. L. Grey (10099), RAFVR.
G. L. Gryspeerdt (76143), RAFVR.
R. Hadingham (40697), RAFO.
G. Haigh (68921), RAFVR.
H. G. Hanks (72299), RAFVR.
C. H. G. Hart (69578), RAFVR.
H. Hilliard (67572), RAFVR.
W. C. Hoey (40706), RAFO.
P. Honey (35231).
E. Howett (72413), RAFVR.
L. D. A. Hussey (87314), RAFVR.
C. J. K. Hutchins (37177).
A. H. Jack (78652), RAFVR.
D. C. James (72867), RAFVR.
W. L. James (83676), RAFVR.
T. E. Bangor-Jones (82460), RAFVR.
T. S. B. Kelly, MB, ChB, LRCP&S, LRFP&S (72070), RAFVR.
H. F. Knight (44213).
A. H. Knowles (31229).
C. J. Lawrence (76497), RAFVR.
R. Leaning (10606), RAFVR.
T. R. Leatherdale (70390), RAFO.
F. W. Lee (72693), RAFVR.
J. D. St. C. Olliff-Lee (90218), AAF.
R. A. Little (72142), RAFVR.
C. R. Lliffe (31227).
J. D. Loughnan (79246), RAFVR.
J. H. McElney (75392), RAFVR.
R. E. McKenzie, MB, ChB (79346), RAFVR.
A. Macnicol (82893), RAFVR.
D. H. G. MacQuaide (83658), RAFVR.
S. C. Macey (71352), RAFO.
D. J. Marler (31341), RAFO.
E. H. B. Martin (81179), RAFVR.
P. Meston (33297).
C. J. Miln (77541). RAFVR.
C. E. Milner (129586), RAFVR.
F. V. Morris (101700), RAFVR.
H. W. Morton (41945), RAFO.
L. R. Mouatt (28159).
J. B. Murphy (70933), RAFO.
H. Nelson (75866), RAFVR.
R. M. Nisbet (91153), AAF.
E. A. Pacello (31493).
C. D. Palmer (05077).
W. E. Palmer (43875)
L. G. Patmore (87096), RAFVR.
B. E. Peck, DFC (40481).
F. H. Peers (70531), RAFO.
J. H. Penny (86726), RAFVR.
A. G. Peters (43209).
C. E. Plummer (72498), RAFVR.
J. Pirie (21316).
R. P. Potgieter (39754), RAFO.
J. F. Powell (73348), RAFVR.
R. Y. Powell (45714).
J. A. Pring, OBE (75220), RAFVR.
R. E. Pritchard (145365), RAFVR.
M. C. Rawlence (78107), RAFVR.
W. J. Reason (75743), RAFVR.
F. H. V. Robinson (62728), RAFVR.
L. Robinson (43735).
D. W. Rowson (36218).
A. W. Ruffell (70786), RAFO.
C. St. Leger-Brightman (76266), RAFVR.
L. G. Scott (89703), RAFVR.
J. A. C. Scoular (46185).
F. C. Seldon (76259), RAFVR.
E. H. Sillince (44885).
G. F. Simpson (104378), RAFVR.
R. Stevenson (40760), RAFO.
W. L. Stevenson (119317), RAFVR.
E. M. Stewart (70650), RAFO.
R. W. Stewart (72097), RAFVR.
A. G. Stringer (76106), RAFVR.
E. Swale, DFC (74573), RAFVR.
K. W. Swann (50889).
A. R. Taylor (104027), RAFVR.
G. E. Terry (60717), RAFVR.
J. Terry (50621), RAFVR.
G. E. Thomas (87723), RAFVR.
J. L. Thrussell, MBE (44202).
T. G. Tindale (119492), RAFVR.
G. W. Tookey (77328), RAFVR.
R. M. Tothill (78003), RAFVR.
W. H. Trickett (80596), RAFVR.
C. J. Van Den Bergh (65425), RAFVR.
M. Vlasto, DFC (108232), RAFVR.
H. G. Vyse (76451), RAFVR.
F. Walker (46273).
B. Weil (83326), RAFVR.
S. C. Williamson (74580), RAFVR.
C. C. Willott (43566).
A. Sidney-Wilmot (79439), RAFVR.
R. F. Zobel (140505), RAFVR.

 Chaplains

The Rev. D. G. Benson.
The Rev. G. H. C. Church, RAFVR.
The Rev. W. Fearn.
The Rev. R. C. O. Goodchild, RAFVR.
The Rev. R. S. Hawkins, RAFVR.
The Rev. A. S. Ireson, RAFVR.
The Rev. I. E. Douglas-Jones, RAFVR.
The Rev. W. R. C. Joyce, RAFVR.
The Rev. F. Morgan, RAFVR.
The Rev. J. K. Page, RAFVR.
The Rev. J. Parker, RAFVR.
The Rev. K. C. Phillips, RAFVR.
The Rev. B. F. J. Plumley, RAFVR.
The Rev. W. A. Rhodes, RAFVR.
The Rev. T. I. Robinson, RAFVR.
The Rev. S. A. Sheppard, RAFVR.
The Rev. G. H. Sully, RAFVR.
The Rev. R. O. Tasker, RAFVR.
The Rev. J. J. Winstanley, RAFVR.

 Honorary Squadron Leader
A. Charlesby (71125), RAFO.

 Acting Squadron Leaders

H. Adcock, OBE (82314), RAFVR.
E. G. N. Amies (103623), RAFVR.
A. F. Amor (46412).
H. E. Arnholz (87756), RAFVR.
R. Y. Ashley, DFC (79744), RAFVR.
E. W. S. Austin (46584).
R. B. Austin (100677), RAFVR.
S. C. Baker (45164).
W. M. Barber (77859), RAFVR.
B. D. Barker, DFC (129452), RAFVR.
C. A. Barnes, DFC (62268), RAFVR.
S. P. S. Bartlett (78883), RAFVR.
J. H. Bartram (110898), RAFVR.
C. J. Bayley (77325), RAFVR.
H. Beattie (45311).
A. E. Beeson (108536), RAFVR.
P. Bennett (104738), RAFVR.
R. H. Bennett (76500), RAFVR.
E. J. Blair (81864), RAFVR.
G. T. Block (44326).
W. J. Blomfield (115667), RAFVR.
N. M. Bode (134519), RAFVR.
K. F. P. Bond (40666), RAFO.
G. S. Bosworth (80586), RAFVR.
A. Bourne (81755), RAFVR.
C. H. Boutflower (109532), RAFVR.
J. D. Bowen (43315).
R. S. L. Bowker (65622).
V. P. Brooks (77257), RAFVR.
R. H. C. Brousson (73182), RAFVR.
C. J. Brown (68295), RAFVR.
F. Brown (46457), RAFVR.
V. P. Brown (79758), RAFVR.
R. A. Browne (119835), RAFVR.
C. E. Bryant, DSO (80915), RAFVR.
G. Buckley (91190), AAF.
N. B. Buckley, DFC (48371), RAFO.
H. H. Bull (81115), RAFVR.
T. F. Bullus (77431), RAFVR.
P. B. Burnett (60850), RAFVR.
J. W. Burrough, DFC (104370).
D. Burrows (79750), RAFVR.
S. R. H. Cadier (111386), RAFVR.
W. S. H. Cairns (65415), RAFVR.
P. D. Carden, DFC (84316), RAFVR.
J. R. A. Careless, DFC (43263).
R. Carfrae (68225), RAFVR.
H. E. Carris (11.2669), RAFVR.
R. H. Carson (103060), RAFVR.
H. J. Carter, DFC (104474), RAFVR.
J. Carter (113409), RAFVR.
D. P. Cartwright (82324), RAFVR.
R. C. F. Carver (88192), RAFVR.
W. C. Caswell (89446), RAFVR.
E. J. K. Chapman (120819), RAFVR.
R. R. Chapman (44863), RAF Regiment.
P. N. Charles (88935), RAFVR.
A. V. R. N. Chart (45367).
W. G. Cheesman (68865), RAFVR.
G. D. Cheyne (87480), RAFVR.
J. S. Chown (46593).
J. G. Clark (113408), RAFVR.
S. E. Clark (102677), RAFVR.
S. G. Clarke (102780), RAFVR.
A. S. Clarkson (47429), RAFVR.
E. W. Claydon (79584), RAFVR.
C. W. D. Cole (89036), RAFVR.
F. W. Collins (113796), RAFVR.
G. F. Collins (81189), RAFVR.
M. F. Comer (77540), RAFVR.
R. M. Comber (116127), RAFVR.
C. Conroy (123876), RAFVR.
E. Cook (126087), RAFVR.
A. H. L. Cooper (87766), RAFVR.
G. R. Cooper, DFC (87072), RAFVR.
H. J. Cooper (130584), RAFVR.
A. R. Cottle (87516), RAFVR.
G. J. Craig (74788), RAFVR.
W. H. Crittle (46096).
W. R. Crofts, DFM (46177).
B. E. D. Cuddon (79312), RAFVR.
F. J. S. Culley (106973), RAFVR.
H. V. Dacombe (114188), RAFVR.
J. S. M. Dagnall (123900), RAFVR.
G. Davidson (44034).
H. F. Davis (44840).
W. R. Deacon (64963), RAFVR.
C. A. Deakin, AFM (46267).
V. H. Dean (118427), RAFVR.
E. D. Deane (44443).
C. F. De Hamel (79314), RAFVR.
F. R. Derry, DFC (87862), RAFVR.
C. H. C. Down (48055).
D. S. Downs (85460), RAFVR.
T. W. Dowson (118982), RAFVR.
G. A. Draycott (118997), RAFVR.
K. G. C. Eaves (119543), RAFVR.
E. L. Eldridge (82079), RAFVR.
S. G. P. Ellender (47046).
H. D. Elliott (88625), RAFVR.
G. J. Evans (73952), RAFVR.
H. C. Evans (44379).
L. V. Evans (85386), RAFVR.
S. R. Evans (86056), RAFVR.
V. C. Ewens (44290).
E. A. Fairhurst, DFC (43547).
D. J. Farquharson (84217), RAFVR.
H. R. R. Feilding (64882), RAFVR.
G. E. Ferguson (83215), RAFVR.
R. Fernie (46241).
E. Fielden (107840), RAFVR.
H. T. Flintoft (89455), RAFVR.
C. C. Flynn (46247).
C. J. Fooks, DFC (111679), RAFVR.
A. J. Ford (77855), RAFVR.
R. L. Ford (88771), RAFVR.
G. M. Fossick (77582), RAFVR.
A. D. Foster (64768), RAFVR.
J. W. Foster (134757), RAFVR.
L. J. W. P. Fountain (82395), RAFVR.
E. Fowler (83938), RAFVR.
E. E. Frankenburg (74802), RAFVR.
A. L. Fussell (80930), RAFVR.
T. Gallagher, MBE (46101).
E. J. Galloway (101158), RAFVR.
D. Garden (124010), RAFVR.
J. E. Garlick (48294).
W. T. Garratt (118291), RAF Regiment.
W. I. German (63936), RAFVR.
E. C. Geary (68237), RAFVR.
A. F. H. Gee (78911), RAFVR.
A. J. George (44987).
C. A. Gibbs (57299), RAFVR.
D. E. Gibbs, MBE (45383).
M. Giddings (103753), RAFVR.
J. Gilmour (129192), RAFVR.
Y. Gilutz (87188), RAFVR.
E. S. Gladwell (102187), RAF Regiment.
L. J. Godding (105903), RAFVR.
J. S. H. Goodall (139261), RAFVR.
J. Goodman (45362).
D. C. Goodrich (47331).
R. C. Gorddard (46078).
A. W. Gordon (118785), RAFVR.
J. H. Gould (68240), RAFVR.
C. R. V. Gray (69530), RAFVR.
J. Grayston (118786), RAF Regiment.
C. L. Green (115778), RAFVR.
F. Griffin (45764).
J. B. Griffith (50596).
N. A. Gwyther (46656).
W. F. Haines (48113), RAFVR.
G. M. Hall (64778), RAFVR.
R. W. Hamilton (142412), RAFVR.
R. H. Hansen (42603), RAFVR.
G. H. Hargreaves (89921), RAFVR.
N. M. W. Harris (75133).
J. A. E. Harrisson (85387), RAFVR.
F. Hart, DFC (78008), RAFVR.
W. C. Hart (140507).
L. R. Hastings, DFC (124562), RAFVR.
F. Haworth, DFC, DFM (46211).
N. Haycocks (106913), RAFVR.
P. J. Hearne (129957), RAFVR.
D. I. E. Heath (131181), RAFVR.
K. Herring (47089).
H. G. Highton (117311), RAFVR.
D. E. Hilliard (46746).
E. F. Hine, OBE (100134), RAFVR.
G. C. Hipkin, MBE (47529).
J. E. A. Hoare, DSC (70309), RAFO.
M. F. Hobden (118331), RAFVR.
N. Vere-Hodge (115708), RAFVR.
J. R. C. Honeybone (107599), RAFVR.
R. M. Hood (60647), RAFVR.
C. A. Hopkins (75902), RAFVR.
R. A. Hoskins (77823), RAFVR.
G. C. Howard (84944), RAFVR.
W. F. Howe (44694).
A. Hudson (48758).
E. M. F. Hudson (87830), RAFVR.
G. D. Hughes (103796), RAFVR.
Sir H. W. Hulse (77159).
B. V. Humphrey (48116).
S. J. Hunt (60213), RAFVR.
J. E. Hunter (80688), RAFVR.
J. C. Hutchinson (60977), RAFVR.
J. R. Illingworth (144892), RAFVR.
C. F. Ingle (86547), RAFVR.
L. Irwin (126922), RAFVR.
E. Jackson (106838), RAFVR.
G. H. N. Jacques (122042), RAFVR.
A. M. Jamieson (86501), RAFVR.
J. M. Jenkins (100219), RAFVR.
H. V. Jessop (75665), RAFVR.
D. S. Jewell (82341), RAFVR.
W. A. Johnson (83487), RAFVR.
E. H. Jones (82952), RAFVR.
F. A. Jones (100768), RAFVR.
J. Lloyd-Jones (110065), RAFVR.
W. H. Jones, DFC (80625), RAFVR.
W. H. R. Jones (89824), RAFVR.
W. F. Jordan (76529), RAFVR.
B. B. Joseph (62478), RAFVR.
F. R. R. Kaye (75882), RAFVR.
R. Kellie (104154), RAFVR.
W. J. E. Kenaelly (44396).
W. N. Kenyon (88395), RAFVR.
D. V. Kidman (77749), RAFVR.
S. L. Kilburn (90655), AAF.
C. G. Kimbrey (47535).
G. M. Kingsford (78933), RAFVR.
(Sir) J. A. Kirkpatrick (85000), RAFVR.
F. T. Kitchin (84113), RAFVR.
H. S. L. Knight (131733), RAFVR.
T. F. Kyle (44380).
A. C. J. Lagden (103200), RAFVR.
A. Lammer, DFC (81940), RAFVR.
R. B. P. Land (43453).
R. W. Languish (112332), RAFVR.
W. G. Larman (81945), RAFVR.
H. C. Lawrence (87778), RAFVR.
F. A. Lawson (105251), RAFVR.
H. W. Lees (111558), RAFVR.
H. Levack (45748).
C. V. Lewin (61375), RAFVR.
R. E. R. Lloyd (78052), RAFVR.
C. G. Lomax, DFC (120558), RAFVR.
H. D. Longmate (83564), RAFVR.
W. Lowry (70411), RAFVR.
J. F. Lucas (61513), RAFVR.
F. H. Ludford (62391), RAFVR.
C. A. Lyall (107703), RAFVR.
C. L. O. MacAlister (110809), RAFVR.
H. T. Macauley (84258), RAFVR.
J. H. McCoy (112459), RAFVR.
J. McGrath (110069), RAFVR.
I. M. MacGregor (62229), RAFVR.
M. Macintyre (46140).
G. L. A. McKenny, DFC (62002).
C. H. McLeod (117152), RAFVR.
G. H. Malcolm, DSO, DFC (64301), RAFVR.
C. A. Male (82877), RAFVR.
A. Marsden (88110), RAFVR.
A. Martin (73890), RAFVR.
N. W. Maskell (46354).
P. D. May (79941), RAFVR.
A. E. Mayhew (48838).
D. J. Mears (68076), RAFVR.
L. G. Meech (107631), RAFVR.
B. Mendelssohn (84377), RAFVR.
D. R. A. Michael (85942), RAFVR.
R. B. Milburn, DFC (63070), RAFVR.
G. D. Mills (44506).
T. W. H. Mills (100144), RAFVR.
W. M. Mills (67209), RAFVR.
D. C. Moore (82863), RAFVR.
G. H. D. More (60874), RAFVR.
A. J. Morelli (112209), RAFVR.
A. C. B. Morgan, DFC (102966).
L. Morgan (44893).
C. W. Morris (63912), RAFVR.
P. L. O. Morris (85946), RAFVR.
W. Morrison (121520), RAFVR.
P. M. Moulding (85002).
F. J. Mundy (107652), RAFVR.
D. Munro (68893), RAFVR.
F. L. E. Musgrove (75337), RAFVR.
S. D. Musson, MBE (89934), RAFVR.
P. T. Gifford-Nash (85469), RAFVR.
W. J. Nave (79952), RAFVR.
W. E. Newman (74539), RAFVR.
H. A. Newton (60923), RAFVR.
G. N. C. Nicholls (76971), RAFVR.
R. F. Norman (101633), RAFVR.
A. O'Connor (78510), RAFVR.
A. F. O'Connor (87168), RAFVR.
J. R. Oliver (46246).
J. A. A. O'Shea (100187), RAFVR.
A. S. Owen (76117), RAFVR.
E. H. Page (81575), RAFVR.
E. M. Pain, DFC (40640).
J. F. Palmby (130044), RAFVR.
E. B. Park (85196), RAFVR.
J. T. Parsons (47186), RAFVR.
A. M. Paterson, MBE (45922).
T. Patten (69510), RAFVR.
L. Pattinson (119949), RAFVR.
C. Payne, DFC (149559), RAFVR.
G. A. Pears (121434), RAFVR.
G. A. Pearson (46106).
A. P. W. Pepper, DFC (130267), RAFVR.
B. F. Perkins (89830), RAFVR.
C. J. Perkins (47780).
F. N. H. Pexton (103205), RAFVR.
A. S. Phillips (66631), RAFVR.
H. H. Phillips (74200), RAFVR.
A. H. G. Pickering (112643), RAFVR.
R. B. C. Pilliner (84502), RAFVR.
R. W. Pite (86173), RAFVR.
C. H. Pocock (62782), RAFVR.
J. V. Powell (84423), RAFVR.
F. Preston (88293), RAFVR.
N. K. Price (104127), RAFVR.
W. G. Prothero (110488), RAFVR.
D. E. Proudlove (111108), RAFVR.
G. W. Pullan (105821), RAFVR.
V. R. Pullan (21380), RAFO.
N. G. Quenet, MBE (68274), RAFVR.
A. A. Radford (45006).
F. R. Range (44218).
A. Reece, AFC, DSO, DFC (44128).
L. F. Revell (103958), RAFVR.
W. T. R. Richman (80756), RAFVR.
G. A. Richmond (142319), RAFVR.
K. R. Riddell (77563), RAFVR.
F. C. Roberts (123037), RAFVR.
H. O. Roberts (695553), RAFVR.
G. T. Robin (103297), RAFVR.
J. B. Robinson (87786), RAFVR.
C. L. Rosenvinge (133589), RAFVR.
E. W. D. Roy, DFC (47533).
D. E. J. Saint (82713), RAFVR.
W. H. Salmond (89023), RAFVR.
H. L. Sammels (44948).
F. M. R. F. Sander (88922), RAFVR.
J. Sanderson (76121), RAFVR.
J. B. Sayers (131547), RAFVR (deceased).
H. Scott (121373), RAFVR.
J. L. Scott (76498), RAFVR.
J. R. Scott (132372), RAFVR.
P. D. Scott (104442), RAFVR.
H. Seymour (83454), RAFVR.
G. D. Shand (87838), RAFVR.
H. J. E. Shayler (111172), RAFVR.
R. H. Shepherd (121934), RAFVR.
N. B. Sherwell (83017), RAFVR.
J. Liddell-Simpson (90570), AAF.
G. B. Singlehurst, DSO, DFC (60342), RAFVR.
J. C. Skelton (83393), RAFVR.
L. E. Slaney (74803), RAFVR.
B. B. Smith (87840), RAFVR.
C. H. Smith (84233), RAFVR.
D. G. Smith (109281), RAFVR.
D. M. Smith (100779), RAFVR.
J. A. Smith (48077).
L. C. J. Smith (76927), RAFVR.
M. Lawson-Smith (88042), RAFVR.
P. Y. H. Smith (72942), RAFVR.
S. G. W. Spaul (107188), RAFVR.
C. H. Spencer (129994), RAFVR.
G. E. Stamper (67750), RAFVR.
D. B. Stampton (77435), RAFVR.
W. C. J. Starling, BEM (44505).
G. W. Stephen (69523)/RAFVR.
A. Stephenson (87269), RAFVR.
W. L. Stevenson (119317), RAFVR.
A. Stewart, DFC (111947), RAFVR (deceased).
T. A. Stewart, DFC (114955), RAFVR.
H. J. A. Stockbridge (64803), RAFVR.
J. H. Stoney (104830), RAFVR.
D. Strachan (105961), RAFVR.
D. E. Stuart (118371), RAFVR.
F. W. Ballance-Stuart (85415), RAFVR.
W. G. Sweeting (119069), RAFVR.
A. J. S. Bell-Tawse (63385), RAFVR.
M. A. T. Taylor (83660), RAFVR.
M. O. Taylor (104109), RAFVR.
D. S. Thaw (85334), RAFVR.
R. C. A. Thompson (85154), RAFVR.
H. A. Thomson (87142), RAFVR.
R. G. Thurnhill (134297), RAFVR.
J. W. Townsend (86260), RAFVR.
G. F. Tredwell (64879), RAFVR.
H. R. Tucker (44437).
P. G. Tyler (31471), RAFO.
F. H. L. Varcoe (73667), RAFVR.
C. Vaughan (81814), RAFVR.
W. P. T. Vear (83798), RAFVR.
E. S. Venning (75068), RAFVR.
R. G. Vevers (68314), RAFVR.
J. Vivian, DSO, DFC (116153), RAFVR.
B. A. Walkerdine (82035), RAFVR.
F. A. Waller (87116), RAFVR.
S. W. Waller (31489).
E. G. Ward (119325), RAFVR.
J. L. Ward (82032), RAFVR.
W. C. Warner (127177), RAFVR.
J. M. S. Watson (63115), RAFVR.
T. D. Weatherhead (61545), RAFVR.
A. G. Webb (43897).
N. G. H. Weeks (44469).
E. J. Wells (83404), RAFVR.
A. C. G. Wenman (85270), RAFVR.
P. A. Weston (101216), RAFVR.
M. B. Whitbread, DFC (127309), RAFVR.
A. Whitby, DFM (45721).
H. F. Wicks (85202), RAFVR.
J. Wicks (79071), RAFVR.
N. Wilkinson (107406), RAFVR.
E. Williams (133989), RAFVR.
H. Williams (85530), RAFVR.
R. S. F. Williams (44033), RAFVR.
S. Williams (45871).
E. S. Willox (85176), RAFVR.
F. L. Wills (75036), RAFVR.
F. E. Wilson (85796), RAFVR.
H. Corbett-Wilson (43000).
W. F. Wilson (105644), RAFVR.
C. B. Wimbury (89163), RAFVR.
R. G. W. Wing (67273), RAFVR.
G. M. Winterbotham (110391), RAFVR.
R. A. Wolverson (84443), RAFVR.
E. A. Wood (89502), RAFVR.
N. H. Wooding (60424), RAFVR.
J. Woods (103121), RAFVR.
A. C. Woolf (61181), RAFVR.
B. G. T. Wormell (48075).
J. H. Wortley, MM (60847), RAFVR.
J. L. Wynne (108121), RAFVR.
M. Wynroe (60991), RAFVR.
S. J. R. Yelloly (120709), RAFVR.
P. Yeoman (84203), RAFVR.
J. H. D. Young (81733), RAFVR.
J. R. S. Young, DFC (60626), RAFVR.

 Flight Lieutenants

H. Abbott (106763), RAFVR.
D. Agnew (120016), RAFVR.
A. J. C. Akehurst (130881), RAFVR.
J. S. Aldridge (84669), RAFVR.
J. W. E. Alexander (42178).
N. E. Allen (105719), RAFVR.
B. T. Anderson (77743), RAFVR.
G. B. Anderson, MC (79074), RAFVR.
R. H. Anderson (142559), RAFVR.
R. T. Andrews (140609), RAFVR.
B. Ashdown (51424).
S. J. A. Asher (128694), RAFVR.
C. G. Atherton (87172), RAFVR.
F. M. Atkinson (105283), RAFVR.
R. E. Atkinson (41242).
P. F. Bailey (137316), RAFVR.
P. E. Bairstow, DFC (120452), RAFVR.
A. S. Baker (89788), RAFVR.
P. M. Banks (135075), RAFVR.
S. H. J. Barnden (124636), RAFVR.
S. A. Barry (150152), RAFVR.
L. J. Bartley (105991), RAFVR.
L. L. Bartley (42181), RAFO.
C. F. G. Bass (67137), RAFVR.
R. O. P. Beatty, DFC (117570), RAFVR.
K. A. Benson (107036), RAFVR.
A. J. Berkin (86062), RAFVR.
A. Beynon (140003), RAFVR.
V. J. Billing (103261), RAFVR.
J. Bines (128545), RAFVR.
R. W. Birchall, AFM (143917), RAFVR.
T. H. Blake (48734).
E. G. Bligh (86781), RAFVR.
G. Bliss (70070), RAFO.
L. G. Blomfield (78295), RAFVR.
J. M. W. Boyd (107144), RAFVR.
D. J. Boyer (124919), RAFVR.
A. E. Bradley (127117), RAFVR.
J. C. C. Braint (84602), RAFVR.
R. Broadbent, DFC (109356), RAFVR.
W. E. Broadfield (116200), RAFVR.
J. P. Brockbank (110865), RAFVR.
A. M. Brown (135603), RAFVR.
F. Brown (64367), RAFVR.
W. A. Brown (68826), RAFVR.
H. F. Browne (73109), RAFVR.
W. H. Brunskill, DFC (122827), RAFVR.
R. S. Buckle (61838), RAFVR.
J. Budd (121633), RAFVR.
H. Burge (47568).
G. C. Burton (64239), RAFVR.
P. P. Burton (47372).
F. Butler (131971), RAFVR.
W. Butler (130458), RAFVR.
D. H. Button, DFM (50953).
R. W. Bywater (130234), RAFVR.
H. F. J. Callan (118991), RAFVR.
H. Cameron (117327), RAFVR.
J. Campbell (132209), RAFVR.
R. H. Campbell (107856), RAFVR.
R. G. Carpenter (144351), RAFVR.
E. D. Carwithen (89847), RAFVR.
D. A. Casley (49365).
I. H. Cassie (69994), RAFVR.
D. Castle (129512), RAFVR.
G. D. Castle (43351).
E. W. Catley (117446), RAFVR.
L. C. Cesek (78048), RAFVR.
W. H. Cheek, DFC (51799).
P. S. Cheshire (121040), RAFVR.
D. C. Clark (116516), RAFVR.
L. G. Clark, DFC (131639), RAFVR.
E. F. Clennell (80574), RAFVR.
J. Cobb, DFC (51114).
W. V. J. Cole (130297), RAFVR.
R. T. H. Collis (111107), RAFVR.
A. G. H. Cooper (81665), RAFVR.
E. F. Cooper (62797), RAFVR.
T. E. Cooper (142937), RAFVR.
C. W. Coulthard (104469), RAFVR.
J. D. Cousins (121279), RAFVR.
A. L. Cowdry (105702), RAFVR.
J. C. Cox (112516), RAFVR.
H. Criswell, DFC (117990), RAFVR.
J. M. Crook (80354), RAFVR.
T. A. D. Crook (102306), RAFVR.
T. H. Cullen, MBE (81303), RAFVR.
W. J. P. Cunningham (45281).
A. H. Cutting, MB, BS (115951), RAFVR.
A. Dale (103316), RAFVR.
M. L. Daniels (122314), RAFVR.
E. Dann (69961), RAFVR.
J. W. Darling (143886), RAFVR.
W. Davidson (68067), RAFVR.
R. H. R. Davies (78574), RAFVR.
F. J. Day (47743).
G. C. T. Deas (150032), RAFVR.
D. Dewar (70175), RAFO.
R. A. Dewhurst (126093), RAFVR.
G. H. Dhenin, GM (138384), RAFVR.
E. A. Dick (155096), RAFVR.
F. R. P. Digman (62193), RAFVR.
A. W. Dodds (106246), RAFVR.
C. B. Dodridge (47923).
W. B. Doig (137447), RAFVR.
J. D. Dolwin (102633), RAFVR.
J. A. Donson (68764), RAFVR.
W. F. Dorr (110447), RAFVR.
T. M. Douglas (133756), RAFVR.
M. L. Dowling (114255), RAFVR.
K. D. Drysdale (49428).
N. H. Duckworth (46998).
A. L. Duncan (79533), RAFVR.
L. J. P. Dunlop (119722), RAFVR.
F. A. Dungey, DFC (128406), RAFVR.
F. E. Dymond (48316), RAFVR.
K. G. Eckersley (61853).
P. Edelsten (128855), RAFVR.
I. F. Edgar (85642).
R. T. Edwards (127248), RAFVR.
A. C. Elliott (139138), RAFVR.
S. H. J. Elliott (115214), RAFVR.
D. F. R. Emus, AFC (124614), RAFVR.
J. Etchells, DFC (113395), RAFVR.
J. A. Evans (82334), RAFVR.
S. I. Ewart (47203).
R. K. Fairbrother (89755), RAFVR.
A. H. Fairlamb (69978), RAFVR.
F. W. Fennell, DFC (117924), RAFVR.
G. F. Fern, DFM (123815), RAFVR.
K. G. Fisher (142004), RAFVR.
W. D. Fisher (85111), RAFVR.
J. H. Flitcroft (88840), RAFVR.
W. S. Forbes (104638), RAFVR.
F. W. Ford (144496), RAFVR.
J. C. Ford (43677).
R. C. Fordham (47439).
A. F. Forsdike, DFC (61953), RAFVR.
A. D. Forster, MBE (77052), RAFVR.
H. Fowler (119184), RAFVR.
R. J. Fowler (111221), RAFVR.
C. W. L. Fox (116604), RAFVR.
H. R. L. Fraser (66474), RAFVR.
R. A. Frost, DFC (141973), RAFVR.
K. N. Fry (137219), RAFVR.
W. D. Gaffney (47386).
J. F. Galbraith (135842), RAFVR.
E. T. D. Garlick (61103), RAFVR.
J. E. Garrish (83626), RAFVR.
G. R. H. Geoghegan (86076), RAFVR.
P. E. L. Gethin, OBE, DFC (69522), RAFVR.
H. P. Gibbons (131023), RAFVR (deceased).
T. A. Gibbs (130066), RAFVR.
R. W. Gloyne (140140), RAFVR.
J. T. Goddard (106631), RAFVR.
M. L. Godden (141533), RAFVR.
A. G. Golby (60204), RAFVR.
B. R. Goodsir (71443), RAFO.
G. R. Goodwin, DFM (158703), RAFVR.
F. Corner (132214), RAFVR.
T. E. C. Graty (62712), RAFVR.
G. Gray (128543), RAFVR.
K. G. Gray (120015), RAFVR.
A. F. Green (136037), RAFVR.
F. R. Green (86639), RAFVR.
G. C. D. Green (103594), RAFVR.
R. P. Greenwood (86084), RAFVR.
P. R. Hairs (76316), RAFVR.
J. D. Hale (41176), RAFO.
R. N. Hamer (131486), RAFVR.
R. W. Hanner (82046), RAFVR.
W. Harbison (133668), RAFVR.
R. P. Harding (113876), RAFVR.
N. S. Harrild (109122), RAFVR.
J. T. Hart (137247).
E. L. Hartley (136223).
W. P. Hasseldine (115751), RAFVR.
D. R. Hatton (129070), RAFVR (deceased).
J. D. Haworth (80451), RAFVR.
C. W. Hayes (123491), RAFVR.
J. R. Hayward (64817), RAFVR.
G. A. Herlihy (45883).
W. Heath (65974), RAFVR.
E. A. J. Hillman (100042), RAFVR.
E. Hilton (129163), RAFVR.
J. Hinchcliffe (60702), RAFVR.
J. F. Hipwood (65635), RAFVR.
B. H. Holloway (100695), RAFVR.
W. F. Holmes (46818).
W. P. Honeyman (136428), RAFVR.
H. S. Hopcraft (63196), RAFVR.
F. E. G. Hopkins (116011), RAFVR.
M. S. P. Houdret (89052), RAFVR.
N. E. Houghton (89683), RAFVR.
V. Howard (46063).
E. Howey (124810), RAFVR.
M. J. Howlett (117374), RAFVR.
A. M. Hughes (133677), RAFVR.
D. S. Hunt (118235), RAFVR.
G. H. Huntley (12(3597).
J. A. Hutchinson (117886), RAFVR.
G. W. Ions (46376).
P. E. Ipsen (117791), RAFVR.
M. Jackson (124848), RAFVR.
T. H. Jackson (19631), RAFVR.
V. H. Jaynes (122502), RAFVR.
J. R. Jeffrey (132707), RAFVR.
T. John (47134).
H. D. Johnson (119186), RAFVR.
J. W. Jones (105999), RAFVR.
P. R. Jones (113199), RAFVR.
H. L. Karby (111746), RAFVR.
J. B. Karran (67560), RAFVR.
H. D. Kelvin (66571), RAFVR.
R. Kennedy (138845), RAFVR.
H. R. Kerr (136728), RAFVR.
E. G. King (49493).
E. J. Kinshott (140768), RAFVR.
L. F. Lampitt (110061), RAFVR.
A. F. Lang (129762), RAFVR.
E. Y. Lapham (60157), RAFVR.
N. Lawrence (61621), RAFVR.
G. A. Lean (109929), RAFVR.
C. W. Lawson (69928), RAFVR.
P. J. R. Lee (118475), RAFVR.
T. M. Lee (115286), RAFVR.
R. W. Leggett (122820), RAFVR.
P. Lewis (176271), RAFVR.
M. Lissner, DFC (86413), RAFVR.
F. C. L. Littlejohns (73975), RAFVR.
R. G. Long (103852), RAFVR.
A. H. Love (121316), RAFVR.
E. V. Lyell (86576), RAFVR.
D. C. Lynch (77847), RAFVR.
W. E. McChesney (46291).
R. C. McDougall (61170), RAFVR.
A. H. McGrady (48780).
D. McIntosh (144397), RAFVR.
K. A. Mackenzie (138918), RAFVR.
R. C. W. McMullan, DFC, DFM (132985), RAFVR.
I. M. Macnicol (116738), RAFVR.
G. A. McPartlin (61378), RAFVR.
H. A. Haddocks (101690), RAFVR.
G. H. Mair (147222), RAFVR.
J. E. Marsh (146852), RAFVR.
R. W. Marshall (46014).
W. C. Marshall (126834), RAFVR.
E. J. Matthews (87806), RAFVR.
S. F. Maunder (128021), RAFVR (deceased).
A. J. May (120179), RAFVR.
R. J. O. Maybury (49552).
T. L. Mayfield (135474), RAFVR.
M. F. Meredith (140011), RAFVR.
A. M. Michie (122225), RAFVR.
P. O. Miles, DFC (112012), RAFVR.
S. I. Millar (139881), RAFVR.
E. G. Miller (101696), RAFVR.
G. C. Millichamp (81582), RAFVR.
E. P. T. Milway (47967).
W. J. Mitchell (77380), RAFVR.
E. W. Mogg (76288), RAFVR.
H. R. Moore (82418), RAFVR.
R. E. Morgan 176539), RAFVR.
W. V. Morgan (136570), RAFVR.
M. A. Mortimer, DFC (124329), RAFVR.
R. N. Moss (106285), RAFVR.
A. W. Motion (88785), RAFVR.
N. E. Muckle (130838), RAFVR.
D. W. Muglestone (158350), RAFVR.
H. Mulholland (134609), RAFVR.
B. R. Murphy (119286), RAFVR.
L. H. J. Nash (134022), RAFVR.
J. A. Neville (126843), RAFVR.
I. O. Newton (141754), RAFVR.
D. B. Nixon (141725), RAFVR.
J. Nixon (122088), RAFVR.
W. S. Noble (117978), RAFVR.
D. J. G. Norton (134037), RAFVR.
F. T. O'Connell (46104).
J. D. O'Gorman (102291), RAFVR.
A. J. Oury (138848), RAFVR.
D. G. O. Owen (80333), RAFVR.
J. C. Page (76924), RAFVR.
D. A. Parrott (83929), RAFVR.
H. Parrott (138428), RAFVR.
E. W. Partridge (89300), RAFVR.
G. E. Payne (68305), RAFVR.
J. Pearson (141505), RAFVR.
H. W. Peel (52175).
J. O. Pennington, DFC (144275), RAFVR.
R. P. Pepperdine, DFC (145773), RAFVR.
J. E. Perkins (124852), RAFVR.
F. L. Petch (46585).
D. H. Phillips (82839), RAFVR.
N. F. Phillips (148011), RAFVR.
T. G. Pickering (114471), RAFVR.
B. S. J. Piff (46814).
L. A. Pink (120582), RAFVR.
W. R. Plummer (119472), RAFVR.
H. J. Pointer (138897), RAFVR.
R. Poole (119812), RAFVR.
R. E. Pope (81360), RAFVR.
G. A. Potter (117029), RAFVR.
D. J. Powell (141365), RAFVR.
A. C. Pressman (47077).
P. C. Hayter-Preston (117491), RAFVR.
M. B. Price (117564), RAFVR.
A. J. Rabbets (145693), RAFVR.
F. H. Radford (53644).
H. D. Rankin (83710), RAFVR.
A. Rawling (49172).
A. B. H. Reed (86439), RAF Regiment.
C. H. F. Reynolds (61113), RAFVR.
K. Richards (63040), RAFVR.
J. R. T. Richardson (61382), RAFVR.
K. J. Riddy, DFC (63077), RAFVR.
L. C. Robbins (44615).
F. Roberts (142745), RAFVR.
R. M. Emrys-Roberts (138029), RAFVR.
G. E. Robertson (43111), RAFVR.
L. N. Robertson (79697), RAFVR.
J, Rogers (102161), RAFVR.
K. D. U. Rogers (83897), RAFVR.
A. A. Roissetter (46279).
R. K. C. Rose (85580), RAFVR.
S. E. Ross (108752), RAFVR.
B. E. T. Rostron (138906), RAFVR.
K. Ruskell, DFC (131595), RAFVR.
J. E. Russell (116495), RAFVR.
F. R. R. Sale (66101), RAFVR.
J. G. Sandison (41804), RAFO.
R. A. Sandison (121445), RAFVR.
R. E. B. Sargent, AFC (122024), RAFVR.
A. L. O. Scadding (139824), RAFVR.
E. A. Scorer (140477), RAFVR.
W. E. Scott (101828), RAFVR.
E. Sealey (48020).
S. Semple (140208), RAFVR.
G. W. Sharp (104407), RAFVR.
C. Shaw (47515).
H. J. Simms (51362).
S. W. Simms (137086).
W. F. Simpson (89944), RAFVR.
P. J. Sindell (46322).
A. E. Sloman (123018), RAFVR.
B. M. Smith (121943), RAFVR.
H. Smith (61401), RAFVR.
J. Smith (134020), RAFVR.
J. G. Smith (120608), RAFVR.
R. Smith (140045), RAFVR.
T. Smith (140004), RAFVR.
B. N. Sonley (106951), RAFVR.
G. M. Southcombe (111840), RAFVR.
H. G. Sparks, MBE (46189).
G. F. Sparrow (132338), RAFVR.
D. J. Speares (121395), RAFVR.
T. D. Spencer (48535).
J. R. Spiers (143703), RAFVR.
N. F. Spurr (102178), RAFVR.
A. A. Standen (46118).
C. F. Starr (144382), RAFVR.
G. Stephenson (72949), RAFVR.
B. C. G. Stevens (115528), RAFVR.
H. M. Stevenson (79449), RAFVR.
A. R. Stewart (117130), RAFVR.
J. Stockden (133758), RAFVR.
D. Stothard (47480).
G. R. Styles (63041), RAFVR.
W. R. Tait (55104), RAFVR.
J. G. Talbot (85723), RAFVR.
J. M. Talbot (110942), RAFVR.
M. Tarbet (127687), RAFVR.
W. Taylor (102126), RAFVR.
W. S. Thimblethorpe (75698), RAFVR.
D. R. Thomas (140466), RAFVR.
K. I. Thomas (51216).
J. R. Thomlinson (82229), RAFVR.
A. W. Thompson (109488), RAFVR (deceased).
R. Thompson, DFC (115327).
E. Thomson (113423), RAFVR.
F. W. Tipple (64277), RAFVR.
F. E. G. Tookey (123695), RAFVR.
R. A. Toy (151478), RAFVR.
R. J. Tremayne (84433), RAFVR.
J. W. F. Trievnor (137651), RAFVR.
R. Tuck (13027), RAFO.
L. G. L. Turner (112101), RAFVR.
G. J. Vaughan (140931), RAFVR.
E. N. Ventham (46105).
C. H. Vickerman (109454), RAFVR.
J. Walker (124619), RAFVR.
C. M. G. Wallwork (87899), RAFVR.
G. C. H. Walsh (123509), RAFVR.
E. F. Walter (77475), RAFVR.
A. B. Walton (86182), RAFVR.
N. Ward (114420), RAFVR.
W. R. Ward (84640), RAFVR.
T. C. Warnock (127325), RAFVR.
J. C. Warren, MC, DCM (82245), RAFVR.
S. A. Warren (48751).
J. C. R. Waterhouse (112749), RAFVR.
W. K. Watkins (89886), RAFVR.
R. Watson (61455), RAFVR.
J. Weber (115547), RAFVR.
A. T. Webster (123619), RAFVR.
R. O. Webster (127955) (deceased).
E. W. Weekley (63168), RAFVR.
H. W. Wickham, DFC (124631), RAFVR.
W. J. Wilkinson, DFM (143091), RAFVR.
K. Williams, DFC (121256), RAFVR.
R. A. Williamson (131001), RAFVR.
D. B. Wills (115997). RAFVR.
J. Wilson (68121), RAFVR.
C. B. B. Wood (113812), RAFVR.
R. J. Woodroffe (87903), RAFVR.
F. J. Wools (129391), RAFVR.
D. Wright (131913), RAFVR.
F. W. Wright (83761), RAFVR.
W. G. Wright, DFC (138402), RAFVR.
G. C. P. Wyeth (132199).
N. B. Young (130802), RAFVR.

 Honorary Flight Lieutenants
L. P. Cox (71196), RAFO.
R. T. Dart (71195), RAFO.

 Acting Flight Lieutenants

W. T. Abbott (51229).
L. F. Abraham (63227), RAFVR.
R. Acton (147822), RAFVR.
R. Agnew (50157).
J. C. Allan (101138), RAFVR.
H. R. Allen (122459), RAFVR.
L. J. G. Allen (130090), RAFVR.
N. V. Almy (116561), RAFVR.
F. C. Apps (51151).
A. W. Arkinstall (52721).
J. M. Arnott (120198), RAFVR.
E. W. Ashton (105659), RAFVR.
S. F. Ashwood (138946), RAFVR.
R. G. Atkins (126562), RAFVR.
E. H. Banks (115088), RAFVR.
J. C. Barker (47592).
W. L. Barnes (101140), RAFVR.
N. Barratt (100214), RAFVR.
J. L. Bayston (108371), RAFVR.
H. G. Beales (48234).
A. F. Bell (86928), RAFVR.
G. Betteley (133280), RAFVR.
S. F. Bidmead (111794), RAFVR.
G. L. Birch (107549), RAFVR.
D. F. Bland (109412), RAFVR.
W. C. Bland (146168), RAFVR.
R. C. Blackham (136478), RAFVR.
G. R. Boak (68289), RAFVR.
W. Booth (104251), RAFVR.
J. A. Bott, DFM (144655), RAFVR.
G. J. Bowie (157460), RAFVR.
C. P. Bradshaw (169720), RAFVR.
W. H. C. Brain (49762).
S. G. J. Briault (136972), RAFVR.
R. F. Brookes (106306), RAFVR.
J. H. Brooks (53735).
S. A. Brooks (110108), RAFVR.
E. Brown (139145), RAFVR.
E. Brown (113210), RAFVR.
R. Brownlee (17639), RAFVR.
F. C. Brunsdon (113067), RAFVR.
W. Buckley (146169), RAFVR.
J. A. Buddle (141227), RAFVR.
A. H. Heath-Bullock (123903), RAFVR.
C. Burgin (109606), RAFVR.
S. J. Burroughs (113818), RAFVR.
J. Burton (123257), RAFVR.
H. J. Cail (130475), RAFVR.
C. J. Caldicott (49852).
C. E. Cagienard (110981), RAFVR.
C. M. Callan (155153), RAFVR.
D. L. Campbell (172192), RAFVR.
F. H. A. Campbell (102193), RAFVR.
I. M. Campbell (135159), RAFVR.
A. G. Carter (122538), RAFVR.
C. L. Catford (136093), RAFVR.
H. D. Caunce (104747), RAFVR.
F. W. Chandler (113533), RAFVR.
H. Chapman (129497), RAFVR.
W. R. C. Chapman (115119), RAFVR.
W. D. Charles (105741), RAFVR.
C. C. Churchouse (139145), RAFVR.
C. P. Clark (106151), RAFVR.
J. N. Clarke (51188).
P. H. Clifton (157577), RAFVR.
A. T. Clough (60636), RAFVR.
H. P. Clough (144143), RAFVR.
H. J. Clout (159258), RAFVR.
E. Colchester (67145), RAFVR.
H. L. C. Cole (136636), RAFVR.
R. L. Colley (100114), RAFVR.
L. Cook (45220).
C. G. Cornwell (157470), RAFVR.
E. L. Cornwell (136611), RAFVR.
E. J. Croall (125357), RAFVR.
J. W. Crossby (105341), RAFVR.
W. L. Davies (157246), RAFVR.
H. A. Davis (123282), RAFVR.
G. H. Deeley (121491), RAFVR.
A. Delittle (105413), RAFVR.
J. Dodds, DFC (157404), RAFVR.
V. E. Dolman (131810), RAFVR.
R. T. Dowley (107389), RAFVR.
R. H. Dilley (156203), RAFVR.
C. Dimmick (145565), RAFVR.
G. D. S. Dixon (69576), RAFVR.
I. H. J. Doble (49712).
J. G. Dunning (115706), RAFVR.
A. J. Dunsfold (114256), RAFVR.
C. H, A. Easey (49124).
S. A. Eastmead (48254).
S. J. Easton (48945).
A. B. Ebrey (113970), RAFVR.
A. F. Evans (113975), RAFVR.
R. G. Evans (131690), RAFVR.
W. D. Evans (117527), RAFVR.
L. H. Fairbrother (110456), RAFVR.
H. A. Farley (50300).
S. E. Feast (113449), RAFVR.
J. T. Fielding (109459), RAFVR.
R. H. Finch (82080), RAFVR.
R. Fleming (136745), RAFVR.
F. H. Flude (112891), RAFVR.
G. T. Foden (46236).
H. A. R. Fortin (117212), RAFVR.
R. S. K. Fortune (49905).
D. Foster, DFM (156323), RAFVR.
K. W. B. Fouweather (142260), RAFVR.
D. K. Fraser (74258), RAFVR.
A. S. Frater (105344), RAFVR.
S. E. H. Freeman (48460).
D. L. Hussey-Freke (100701), RAFVR.
R. F. H. G. Galere (159188), RAFVR.
D. Gallaghan (117708), RAFVR.
C. H. B. Gardner (117885), RAFVR.
J. E. Garrick (138252), RAFVR.
R. C. Gates (49855).
C. G. Gibson (111811), RAFVR.
A. L. Gilchrist (159788), RAFVR.
N. W. Gillett (111734), RAFVR.
B. T. Good (117382), RAFVR.
E. M. Goodger (110222), RAFVR.
H. J. Gorman (110512), RAFVR.
G. E. F. Gottelier (140800), RAFVR.
V. F. C. Gowland (178651), RAFVR.
J. J. Grant (139043). RAFVR.
D. J. Green (156108), RAFVR.
E. J. Gregory (51453).
H. D. F. Guyton (158499), RAFVR.
A. R. Hall (144865), RAFVR.
F. H. Hall (114279), RAFVR.
C. E. G. Hamlin (46747).
V. S. Hansford (135029), RAFVR.
C. Harding (118795), RAFVR.
L. Harding (110994), RAFVR.
R. Harper (107211), RAFVR.
D. O. P. M. Harrison (118266), RAFVR.
L. S. Harrison (139116).
V. W. C. Harvey (121681), RAFVR.
P. H. F. Hawkins, DFM (143729), RAFVR.
J. H. Heath (101163), RAFVR.
L. Heseltine (115253), RAFVR.
J. C. Higginson (105465), RAFVR.
L. F. Hilborne (118801), RAFVR.
W. N. Hill (100120), RAFVR.
R. M. Hilton (141198), RAFVR.
R. A. Hirons (102788), RAFVR.
H. J. Hoare (113185), RAFVR.
J. B. Hoare (141179), RAFVR.
S. I. Hollingworth (134457), RAFVR.
J. W. Holmes (53282), RAFVR.
M. M. Holmes (103191), RAFVR.
P. Holmes (113940), RAFVR.
L. G. Hope (121778), RAFVR.
W. J. S. Hopkins (131752), RAFVR.
H. H. Houghton (118783), RAFVR.
J. H. Howell (117348).
W. G. Howes (112875).
H. H. Howson (189071), RAFVR.
J. Hudson (133242), RAFVR.
J. C. N. Hughes (147039), RAFVR.
F. Hull (50419).
H. J. Hulse (48847).
J. M. Hunter (118513), RAFVR.
E. W. Ingram (109227), RAFVR.
W. G. Grant-Irwin (117607), RAFVR.
T. R. Isherwood (144924), RAFVR.
J. Jackson (140920), RAFVR.
G. H. Jacobsen, AFM (51074), RAFVR.
B. James (100185), RAFVR.
B. A. James (104921), RAFVR.
I. T. James (114351), RAFVR.
A. E. Jeffrey (160998), RAFVR.
R. A. Jennings (111825), RAFVR.
P. H. Johns (48203).
G. Johnston (138267), RAFVR.
H. H. Jones (153094), RAFVR.
P. T. Jones (132561), RAFVR.
R. A. Jones (147399), RAFVR.
R. C. R. Jones (112168), RAFVR.
W. E. Jones (50871).
H. Karten (117623), RAFVR.
D. A. Kellond (103822), RAFVR.
G. C. Kelly (136974), RAFVR.
C. W. Kemp (46575).
D. K. Kempston (49458).
C. Kennair (107500), RAFVR.
H. G. Kimpton (51338).
N. T. S. King (114360), RAFVR.
C. Kinnaird (50566).
N. Kirby (138009), RAFVR.
A. Kratt (112773).
E. T. Lace ( 7536), RAFVR.
J. V. Lach (141631), RAFVR.
W. E. Ladd (82250), RAFVR.
R. C. Lambert (50875).
P. H. E. Lauder (138377), RAFVR.
A. R. Lawes (52295).
S. R. Leeder (51640).
L. Legg (68546), RAFVR.
J. Leslie (49498).
J. Lewis (145852), RAFVR.
L. G. Lewsey (157282), RAFVR.
S. J. Lidstone (51246).
E. G. Lines (53660).
C. A. Little (148303), RAFVR.
A. E. Lomas (144467), RAFVR.
E. Longden (122718), RAFVR.
W. H. Lovesy (146993), RAFVR.
H. Lowery (142956), RAFVR.
T. J. Lugg (138587), RAFVR.
J. S. Macara (106587), RAFVR.
P. McDermott (52445).
F. P. T. MacDonald (117249), RAFVR.
D. J. Mackenzie (112194), RAFVR.
A. J. Maclay (103233), RAFVR.
M. B. McLeod (111568), RAFVR.
D. P. MacPherson (112196), RAFVR.
D. Macwhirter (50839).
T. J. McWiggan (169788), RAFVR.
S. T. Mander (168546), RAFVR.
W. J. A. Mann (130487), RAFVR.
W. G. Martin (46556).
H. A. Mason (68283), RAFVR.
H. W. Meadows (129309), RAFVR.
W. Meekin (123208), RAFVR.
D. McG. Menzies (131670), RAFVR.
L. R. Miers (147477), RAFVR.
R. Millership (124288), RAFVR.
A. H. Mitchell (130347), RAFVR.
N. Mitchell (103893), RAFVR.
A. H. W. Mold (130961), RAFVR.
R. L. Moody (157268), RAFVR.
L. E. Moran, DFC (52937), RAFVR.
A. P. Morris (142430), RAFVR.
L. C. Moynihan (123814), RAF Regiment.
C. L. Mull (105713), RAFVR.
F. Murphy (119161), RAFVR.
J. T. Murphy (50360).
R. M. Murray (140479), RAFVR.
A. Nesbit (54020), RAFVR.
T. W. Newman (114459), RAFVR.
E. J. Newnham (159113), RAFVR.
G. J. H. Nichol (111008), RAFVR.
W. L. Nix (113808), RAFVR.
C. Northover (114390), RAFVR.
D. J. G. Norton (134037), RAFVR.
G. J. Nutkins (106901), RAFVR.
W. E. Nuttall (103909), RAFVR.
I. B. Ogilvie (49390), RAFVR.
F. Ogley (155713), RAFVR.
H. F. Orchard (145207), RAFVR.
C. F. Osborn (142286), RAFVR.
F. Pakes (51622).
G. Parish (52992).
A. E. Parmenter (162618), RAFVR.
C. J. Parris (113028), RAFVR.
D. G. Parry (106118), RAFVR.
N. Pascall (123184), RAFVR.
F. E. Pearson (114394), RAFVR.
F. Pembry (48877).
M. H. Perry (53688).
P. R. Pfaff (132552), RAFVR.
F. Pickering (134281), RAFVR.
L. Pickup (114018), RAFVR.
J. T. Pike (50393).
W. J. Pope (49517).
R. E. Porteous (52516).
J. A. Powell (138223), RAFVR.
J. W. Powell (120844), RAFVR.
P. Procter (109728), RAFVR.
H. E. Pullen (51997).
M. G. Radcliffe (67172), RAFVR.
L. Rae (120143), RAFVR.
K. R. Reed (119366), RAFVR.
A. H. Revill (128040), RAFVR.
R. D. Richardson (49393).
E. R. M. Roberts (112234), RAFVR.
J. E. Roberts (53009), RAFVR.
J. F. Roberts (67217), RAFVR.
T. Robertson (103965), RAFVR.
R. T. Robinson (106106), RAFVR.
H. R. Rocky (139236), RAFVR.
G. W. A. Roe (54149).
H. Rogers (116491), RAFVR.
E. J. A. Rolfe (123177), RAFVR.
M. C. Rose (68771), RAFVR
R. S. Ross (104821), RAFVR.
H. G. Rowe (48344), RAFVR.
P. A. Rowland (141190), RAFVR.
F. W. Sadler (103974), RAFVR.
F. W. Sander (107634), RAFVR.
J. C. Sargent (136998), RAFVR.
E. R. J. Scarrett (126573), RAFVR.
B. Scott (47980).
G. Scott (50425).
F. W. H. Seamark (52409).
R. L. McL. Sim (107710), RAFVR.
R. Simpson (110272), RAFVR.
C. A. M. Sims (102750), RAFVR.
T. Smart (155578), RAFVR.
B. C. G. Smith (158212), RAFVR.
C. T. Smith (110016), RAF Regiment.
E. Smith (48023).
E. A. Smith (142311), RAFVR.
J. Smith (123677), RAFVR.
J. E. Smith (51487).
J. M. Smith (137070), RAFVR.
R. G. Spanton (138273), RAFVR.
R. O. Soper (54414).
B. J. H. Spearing (105359), RAFVR.
D. L. Speeks (134172), RAFVR.
J. D. Stafford (51365).
B. F. Stannard (51630).
G. A. Stevens (51100).
G. T. Stevens (51984).
F. H. Stokes (139314), RAFVR.
J. F. Stott (113606), RAFVR.
C. A. Strange (170062), RAFVR.
G. R. W. Sully (131589), RAFVR.
A. B. Sutcliffe (144490)
D. E. Sweeny (141062), RAFVR.
K. E. Swinfen (104023), RAFVR.
E. F. Taylor (109152), RAFVR.
E. W. Thomas (46954).
J. W. Thomson (145350), RAFVR.
E. J. G. Thring (121492), RAFVR.
F. C. Tighe (139265), RAFVR.
J. Timewell (107701), RAFVR.
S. Tomlinson (109584), RAFVR.
W. M. Townsend (111842), RAFVR.
O. C. Trimby (114638), RAFVR.
S. L. Trowbridge (149895), RAFVR.
J. Turner (105616), RAFVR.
S. Tyas (130051), RAFVR.
F. A. Van Meeteren (112823), RAFVR.
D. W. Vinall (143816), RAFVR.
J. F. Viveash (47977).
J. E. R. Vosper (112126), RAFVR.
J. H. Walker (129273), RAFVR.
L. V. Walsh (52309) (deceased)
D. Walshe (158432), RAFVR.
J. L. Walter (64391), RAFVR.
F. T. Ward (104063), RAFVR.
F. W. E. Ward (135957), RAFVR.
H. G. M. Ward (118975), RAFVR.
L. G. Watkins (136069), RAFVR.
N. L. Weatherall (113787), RAFVR.
E. G. Webb (105987), RAFVR.
J. R. Webber (49467).
G. W. Weeks (50289).
G. D. Weinstock (109041), RAFVR.
A. J. Wells (158469), RAFVR.
A. V. Wells (53333).
G. L. Welton (143132), RAFVR.
S. C. B. Welton (106298).
C. E. White, CGM (174522), RAFVR.
R. R. White (157017), RAFVR.
W. D. G. Wilkes, DFM (173088), RAFVR.
J. G. Wilkinson (102253), RAFVR.
D. Williams (107817), RAFVR.
T. Williams (110602), RAFVR.
T. G. Williams (144161), RAFVR.
H. Williamson (156825), RAFVR.
W. W. Wilson (50545).
F. A. Winter (130746), RAFVR.
E. C. H. Withnall (108796), RAFVR.
J. L. Wood (101253), RAFVR.
O. D. Wood (86052), RAFVR.
T. A. Woolley (144379), RAFVR.
W. G. Wotton (47797), RAFVR.
G. A. H. Wright (47508).
J. A. Young (114997), RAFVR.

 Flying Officers

D. P. Adams (131735), RAFVR.
W. T. Aitken (148332), RAFVR.
W. H. M. Alexander (159811), RAFVR.
H. J. Allin, BEM (52621).
A. E. Ambrose (170854), RAFVR.
D. Andrew (161725), RAFVR.
R. C. Andrews (119968), RAFVR.
H. T. Anning (52251).
W. J. Arnot (132189), RAFVR.
G. H. Ashton (49816).
F. J. G. Askew (182567), RAFVR.
L. H. Baggs (49344).
W. G. H. Bailey (139183), RAFVR.
S. D. Baldock, DFM (148100), RAFVR.
S. F. Barker (110896), RAFVR.
M. T. O. Bartlett (173914), RAFVR.
A. E. Bashford, DFM (156135), RAFVR.
J. A. Bate, DFC (171923), RAFVR.
E. E. Baughan (161754), RAFVR.
F. S. Beckett (158051), RAFVR.
G. H. Bell (169274), RAFVR.
I. Bellis (155226), RAFVR.
R. Beveridge (122768), RAFVR.
H. J. Bicknell (108342), RAFVR.
W. L. Binns (142249), RAFVR.
H. C. F. Blake (158155), RAFVR.
N. J. Booth (135245), RAFVR.
J. F. Boxell (138616), RAFVR.
D. G. Boyd (126804), RAFVR.
D. P. Brachi (102326), RAFVR.
N. Bradbury (178514), RAFVR.
H. Brazendale (50313).
W. Bremner (144858), RAFVR.
R. E. Brook (53296).
W. R. Brooks (139063), RAFVR.
J. Brough (132887), RAFVR.
R. H. Brown (182010), RAFVR.
A. F. Bryant (53410).
W. R. Buckland (119801), RAFVR.
J. E. Bunyan (175013), RAFVR.
D. R. Carpender (183810), RAFVR.
B. A. W. Chamberlain (130770), RAFVR.
D. L. Chapman (110903), RAFVR.
C. H. Cherry (148310), RAFVR.
K. J. Chetwynd (140822), RAFVR.
T. B. Clark (52221).
F. Clarke (141047), RAFVR.
C. A. L. Cuffe (144204), RAFVR.
A. H. Coburn (123733), RAFVR.
R. R. Collard (157534), RAFVR.
A. Collinson (172724), RAFVR.
W. W. Cooke, DFM (147312), RAFVR.
F. A. Cooper (184780), RAFVR.
P. F. Cooper (176644), RAFVR.
A. E. Corbett (176115), RAFVR.
M. J. Corcoran (174786), RAFVR.
D. H. Court (146811), RAFVR.
E. Cousins (158104), RAFVR.
F. S. Graven (171176), RAFVR.
W. J. Crimmin (157400), RAFVR.
S. A. Critchley (52622).
W. E. J. Cross (51660).
F. Cunliffe (173301), RAFVR.
R. D. Cunnison (155871), RAFVR.
D. H. Curzon (183734), RAFVR.
E. R. Davies (173285), RAFVR.
J. Davies (144482), RAFVR.
H. Dawson (178722), RAFVR.
T. D. Dean (159492), RAFVR.
W. J. Denman (112094), RAFVR.
J. H. Dennis (108554), RAFVR.
G. Denwood, DFC (53945).
C. W. Dent (121068), RAFVR.
N. J. De Verteuil (170477), RAFVR.
E. Dickin (134467), RAFVR.
S. S. H. J. Ditchfield (158168), RAFVR.
P. W. Dod (102220), RAFVR.
F. W. Doidge (182708), RAFVR.
T. P. B. Doolan, DFM (169112), RAFVR.
H. A. S. Doughty (151001), RAFVR.
J. Duckworth (50152).
S. G. E. Dugay (141039), RAFVR.
C. H. J. Dungate (141241), RAFVR.
J. T. Edge (131510), RAFVR.
J. Edwards (172240), RAFVR (deceased).
P. Elener (147862), RAFVR.
W. J. G. Ellens (161561), RAFVR.
D. Ellis (69471), RAFVR.
L. Erridge (137755), RAFVR.
A. Evans (187368), RAFVR.
E. W. Evans (51091).
J. W. Fathers (148201), RAFVR.
L. F. V. Fawcett (170832), RAFVR.
E. C. Fielder (140106), RAFVR.
M. Fitzsimmons (105232), RAFVR.
J. W. Fletcher (145933), RAFVR.
L. C. Ford (123546), RAFVR.
G. G. Fowler (51446), RAFVR.
J. M. France (148841), RAFVR.
S. N. Freestone, DFC (156092), RAFVR.
G. Garland (140097), RAFVR.
G. S. Gee (51451).
W. H. George, DFC (159019), RAFVR.
J. Gold (185516), RAFVR.
R. J. Gooch, DFC (155361), RAFVR.
G. A. Gough (178053), RAFVR.
J. N. Gracie (55869), RAFVR.
F. Green (160670), RAFVR.
F. C. A. Hamilton (170556), RAFVR.
P. L. Hanan (51358).
S. N. Hancock (146908), RAFVR.
J. Harman (173726), RAFVR.
C. H. Harper (153382), RAFVR.
B. Harris (143302), RAFVR.
K. Harrison (110659), RAF Regiment.
A. G. F. Hart (182580), RAFVR.
G. S. Hart (51663).
A. E. Hartnell (54127).
I. Hastings (183367), RAFVR.
H. W. Hawksley (54389).
W. K. J. Haynes (175000), RAFVR.
H. E. K. Heaton (159771).
A. W. Henderson (130482), RAFVR.
F. J. A. Henderson (161292), RAFVR.
J. H. Henderson (143333), RAFVR.
F. E. Hendy (52487).
P. Heptonstall (160699), RAFVR.
C. F. P. Hicks (148396).
S. C. Hill (50689).
C. Horrocks (134855), RAFVR.
T. C. Horsey (112149).
W. Houghton (148594), RAFVR.
W. G. Howgill (112152), RAFVR.
H. D. Hughes (50400).
S. F. Hulme (146681), RAFVR.
K. R. Ilott (137398), RAFVR.
C. M. Jackson (139437), RAFVR.
G. L. Jeffery (113195), RAFVR.
G. Jenkins (52348).
W. Jenkins (159132), RAFVR.
R. A. Jennings (170816), RAFVR.
D. Johnston (139773), RAFVR.
I. Jones (169294), RAFVR.
P. E. T. Jones, DFC (157627), RAFVR.
T. E. P. Jones (123792), RAFVR.
W. R. Jones (170555), RAFVR.
J. Judd (81980), RAFVR.
E. Julian (171015), RAFVR.
H. M. A. Kay (141938), RAFVR.
H. J. R. Kent (141029), RAFVR.
H. E. Kippendale (54143).
F. H. Kirby (138928), RAFVR.
T. J. Kirkpatrick (112774), RAFVR.
E. R. C. Knights (52442).
W. Knowles (108719), RAFVR.
W. V. Lane (155868), RAFVR.
C. W. Leach (52443).
G. N. Leighton (54847).
J. B. Lend (73974), RAFVR (missing).
D. S. Lettington (152831), RAFVR.
E. Levy (157654), RAFVR.
J. W. Lewis (53054).
A. J. Lock (137895), RAFVR.
J. P. Lyall (170812), RAFVR.
L. A. Lytton (156489), RAFVR.
R. J. McAusland (53053).
I. McColl (183773), RAFVR.
D. L McFee (187266) (missing).
L M. Macintosh (158624).
H. A. McKellar (140110), RAFVR.
A. McKenzie (128661), RAFVR.
J. M. McOmie (149382), RAFVR.
D. H. Maling (141987), RAFVR.
A. J. H. Martin (111753), RAFVR.
R. M. Mathieson (178787), RAFVR.
R. W. Measom (172275), RAFVR.
E. J. Midlane (147283), RAFVR.
J. A. Mirchandani (156849), RAFVR.
T. A. J. Mitchell (156482), RAFVR.
P. J. Moloney (173441), RAFVR.
J. E. Morris (175271), RAFVR.
R. R. Moulder (52970).
G. E. Munday (144866), RAFVR.
D. B. Murray (161890), RAFVR.
G. Newman (141673), RAFVR.
W. Noble (131714), RAFVR.
R. Oddie (182760).
J. F. T. Oldfield (174582), RAFVR.
N. Osborne (139079), RAFVR.
W. D. Paddy (54446).
B. G. Pagnam (182758), RAFVR.
E. R. Parsons (116481), RAFVR.
J. A. Pattinson (140212), RAFVR.
G. Napier-Pearn (111755), RAFVR.
C. J. Pedley (157439), RAFVR.
G. E. Penn (144507), RAFVR.
N. F. Perryman (149159), RAFVR.
W. O. Phillips (103206), RAFVR.
L. W. Pilkington (130357), RAFVR.
H. A. Preston (170824), RAFVR.
J. M. J. Quarmby (170820), RAFVR.
E. C. Quick (178034), RAFVR.
J. D. Rae (174219), RAFVR.
V. S. P. Ray (169245), RAFVR.
H. Readman (145735), RAFVR.
J. Reay ( 156923), RAFVR.
W. J. Reid (132553), RAFVR.
T. W. Reynolds (158766), RAFVR.
K. Richards (168573), RAFVR.
C. G. H. Ricketts (135952), RAFVR.
E. A. Riseley (179074), RAFVR.
O. Roberts (186708), RAFVR.
R. W. Robertson (160896), RAFVR.
E. Robinson (130123), RAFVR.
J. K. Rodger (139638), RAFVR.
G. E. C. Rodgers (149892), RAFVR.
A. C. Roe (146189), RAFVR.
1. B. A. Rokes (106594), RAFVR.
F. W. Rooke (158514), RAFVR.
C. D. W. Rose (173203), RAFVR.
H. A. E. Round (134809), RAFVR.
L. A. Runciman (148578), RAFVR.
H. Rushforth (157478), RAFVR.
A. K. Rust (145130), RAFVR.
K. R. Ryman (52403).
R. Samson (52874).
H. H. Sanders (132902), RAFVR.
C. E. Scane (176845), RAFVR.
N. Y. Schofield (111365), RAFVR.
P. H. Scragg (54618).
N. F. Searle (53029).
A. T. Sennett (146981), RAFVR.
S. C. W. Seymour (156476), RAFVR.
C. J. Sharpe (171593), RAFVR.
H. Sherman (123529), RAFVR.
E. H. Sherwood (148242), RAFVR.
M. H. Short (156219), RAFVR.
J. W. Sides (135955). RAFVR.
H. A. Simkins (186064), RAFVR.
G. Sims (47346).
H. R. Smith (157775), RAFVR.
I. D. Smith (80463), RAFVR.
J. Smith (53662).
J. A. Smith (137182), RAFVR.
N. Smith (52468).
G. H. Sparkes (145218), RAFVR.
F. Stanford (179005), RAFVR.
J. E. Staples, DFM (169006), RAFVR.
J. Stephen (179545), RAFVR.
J. W. Still (161079), RAFVR.
J. K. Straker (134237), RAFVR.
C. W. Sugden (143522), RAFVR.
F. Sutcliffe (160809), RAFVR.
H. T. Swan (128837), RAFVR.
G. R. Talbott (137976), RAFVR.
J. J. Tarling (185683), RAFVR.
D. Tasker (146979), RAFVR.
H. I. Taylor (137977), RAFVR.
H. W. H. Taylor (161512), RAFVR.
L. S. Taylor (159633), RAFVR.
R. Y. Taylor (144510), RAFVR.
D. F. J. Tebbit (156650), RAFVR.
J. A. Thomas (140188), RAFVR.
L. P. Thomas (110621), RAFVR.
H. D. Thompson (147724), RAFVR.
W. R. Thompson (114972), RAFVR.
E. E. Thomson (174295), RAFVR.
J. Thomson (50761).
J. B. Thomson (173822), RAFVR.
F. R. Thornton (170573), RAFVR.
C. L. Thorp (175680), RAFVR.
J. Towey (161318), RAFVR.
G. S. Tumman (156298), RAFVR.
P. A. Tunmer (107683), RAFVR.
J. V. Tynan (175958), RAFVR.
A. R. Van Der Heyden (162081), RAFVR.
F. J. Vernon (50654).
D. L. Vinall (131667), RAFVR.
J. W. Vinall (169518) (missing).
S. A. Walker (139776), RAFVR.
J. H. Waller (143281), RAFVR.
M. Salway-Waller (127449), RAFVR.
R. M. Watson (171080), RAFVR.
D. H. Webb (114425), RAFVR.
H. F. Webster (153493), RAFVR.
W. R. Wells (162716), RAFVR.
J. Whalley (148662), RAFVR.
H. A. Whiley (169840), RAFVR.
J. H. White (170794), RAFVR.
R. E. J. White (49470).
F. S. Whittaker (158880), RAFVR.
S. Whittaker (171131), RAFVR.
C. Wilkinson (173708), RAFVR.
P. F. Wilks (182882), RAFVR.
F. G. Williams (143648), RAFVR.
D. Wilson (123978), RAFVR.
I. T. Wilson (177659), RAFVR.
C. G. Wing (54277).
C. S. Wood (54110), RAFVR.
S. C. Woodham (148803), RAFVR.
G. R. Woodward (146978), RAFVR.
F. H. Worsfold (151082), RAFVR.
F. L. Wright (113480), RAFVR.

 Pilot Officers

W. Andrews (188090), RAFVR.
A. B. Campbell (186290), RAFVR.
R. R. L. K. Carson (187936), RAFVR.
W. Gilchrist (117943), RAFVR.
E. J. Holden (162656), RAFVR.
J. T. Hutchinson (169218), RAFVR.
J. M. Jack (169710), RAFVR.
R. Lee (56464).
I. F. H. McKenna (174697), RAFVR.
A. G. Payne (184746.), RAFVR.
F. P. Platt (185771), RAFVR.
W. J. D. Powell (182571), RAFVR.
A. Richards (187106), RAFVR.
E. J. H. Roberts (185446), RAFVR.
H. Rose (130757), RAFVR.
G. Squires (121999), RAFVR.
R. P. Townsend (187921), RAFVR.
I. G. Walker (188562), RAFVR.
T. Ward (188545), RAFVR.
W. E. Watkins (162644), RAFVR.

 Warrant Officers

E. Albone (1221687), RAFVR.
A. Allan (1112055), RAFVR.
E. A. Andrews (743973), RAFVR.
J. T. Appleyard (335493).
T. W. Atkinson (349828).
J. W. Averis (944561), RAFVR.
G. H. Baker (562031).
W. H. Barnett (510842).
L. J. Bassett (562433).
J. Bateson (550830).
G. W. Baxter (1017140), RAFVR.
R. Bennett (352392).
H. L. Birbeck (363859).
T. W. Black (656823).
H. J. Booth (1107464), RAFVR.
P. Braithwaite (347870).
D. W. Brimble (364533).
H. W. Broom (335663).
J. Brown (1065710), RAFVR.
J. J. Brown (564537).
T. W. C. Buckle (336300).
R. H. Buley (140426).
H. L. Burleton (1575900), RAFVR.
S. A. Burness (590745).
E. L. Butcher (335794).
E. G. Carr (365215).
F. V. Carter (364542).
C. R. Castleton (1439195), RAFVR.
A. W. Chaplin (224213).
C. E. Chaplin (1316801), RAFVR.
J. J. Chase (334135).
B. P. Collins (629665).
R. W. Collins (907633), RAFVR.
B. Cooke (515220).
K. R. Cookson (1499896), RAFVR.
R. H. Cooper (567912).
W. T. Cooper (344831).
S. Cross (1218972), RAFVR.
G. W. Culham (1318522), RAFVR.
L. Cunningham (1078549), RAFVR.
J. P. Deal (1282935), RAFVR.
S. A. J. De Souza (238327).
D. W. Davies (928524), RAFVR.
R. Dixon (561099).
D. Dodson (1199997), RAFVR.
W. H. Dolman (328914).
J. R. Donald (1124479), RAFVR.
A. G. Donovan (560744).
C. Dorlin (550018).
W. Elliott (509664).
J. Emery (508589).
E. C. H. Estall (611762).
E. H. Evans (970887), RAFVR.
J. H. Evans (565505).
B. Exley (353687).
H. J. Fagg (343548).
A. W. French (349263).
T. H. B. Furness (553857).
S. G. Gaskin (26126).
C. E. Gates (352161).
E. Geal (615197).
J. C. Gibson (1168675), RAFVR.
L. E. Glitheroe (513798).
T. A. Godfrey (351856).
C. T. Graham (335739).
R. Greenhalgh (512619).
F. E. Craven-Griffiths (354837).
G. L. Guttridge (975331), RAFVR.
C. E. Barker (1305446), RAFVR.
R. Harrison (330868).
A. H. Hart (361986).
W. Hartley (808045), RAFVR.
G. H. Hawkey (1314356), RAFVR.
P. J. Healy (288034).
S. A. Heard (1318212), RAFVR.
H. W. Herridge (356982).
J. M. Hewett (1338781), RAFVR.
K. F. Hickman (590846).
T. R. Kitchen (349868).
W. H. Hodgson (1313893), RAFVR.
T. J. Hooper (1310880), RAFVR.
N. J. Horder (364031).
B. Horrobin (514135).
J. H. Horsfall (561562).
J. Hough (1454677), RAFVR.
J. G. Howell (568037).
J. D. Howells (1530990), RAFVR.
H. Ibbotson (1300387), RAFVR.
B. R. Jacobs (363337).
S. R. J. James (364010).
G. F. Johnson (928614), RAFVR.
P. W. Johnson (363012).
G. F. Deable (346623).
W. H. Keast (351574).
D. C. Keith (363431).
J. F. Kelly (965347), RAFVR.
A. A. E. King (349344).
S. W. King (1383916), RAFVR.
R. W. Lacey (514408).
T. R. Lacey (846050), RAFVR.
R. W. Ladd (1245614), RAFVR.
E. F. Lane (1317828), RAFVR.
B. D. Larner (366132).
S. F. Leaman (335645).
B. H. Lees (508945).
E. Limerick (510502).
J. Linton (330291).
A. J. Lodge (358237).
J. H. Lodge (363171).
J. R. M. Luly (562186).
D. J. McGready (357328).
W. C. McLean (550342).
A. P. Maingot (605475).
A. H. Maltby (352879).
L. R. Mattravers (540087).
D. G. Metcalfe (362057).
H. A. Middleton.
L. S. Milburn (510856).
H. H. Miller (511176).
J. Moir (362449).
E. J. Morgan (521893).
E. Morris (982855), RAFVR.
E. A. Murden (331461).
G. D. I. Neale (550892).
W. A. Nicholson (347882).
A. H. Norman (565120).
H. Northrop (348320).
L. E. Nunn (1302337), RAFVR.
W. F. Osborne (357522).
F. W. W. Page (761304), RAFVR.
L. E. Parker (365586).
A. A. Payne (91018).
G. Perkins (505872).
J. Phillips (1300313), RAFVR.
C. S. Pierce (363197).
F. B. Pilgrim (330377).
G. W. Powell (863530), AAF.
G. Price (178432).
A. J. Randell (365789).
F. Rawe (509179).
E. R. Rawlings (530045).
J. Redmond (1354554), RAFVR.
G. H. Reeves (514151).
R. E. Rennie (365357).
J. J. Reynolds (514404).
E. Rice (4431).
S. R. Richardson (529175).
F. Rickett (349922).
D. A. Robinson (951321), RAFVR.
S. A. Rose (243677).
J. Rowley (95115).
F. W. Salter (506551).
G. Scott (1433776).
E. Sears (342786).
J. F. Sheekey (531819).
O. W. Sherwood (562324).
S. C. Shepherd (509920.
R. H. Simmons (330580).
E. P. Smith (1378234).
L. H. M. Smith (516732).
R. C. Snelling (520329).
T. Solly (560208).
N. K. Spicer (351026).
A. H. Spring (656453).
H. S. Steed (88085).
A. R. Stewart (590891).
E. C. Stokes (590557).
T. Storey (1431804), RAFVR.
H. Streeter (512180).
J. C. Strickett (522717).
G. Suffield (508562).
W. G. Sugden (363246).
E. W. Taylor (1071495), RAFVR.
J. M. Thomas (1257994), RAFVR.
R. V. Timpson (353548).
H. T. Townsend (357291).
T. W. Townshend (801555), AAF.
J. W. Tredwell (1338166), RAFVR.
R. J. B. Trim (906767), RAFVR.
H. Turner (161676), RAFVR.
J. F. Turner (363764).
T. Turner (365071).
S. Uttley (507419).
M. H. Waite (580048).
G. A. Weeks (363049).
W. Wells (590308).
H. W. Whent (512915).
C. Whiting (344312).
A. K. Wilch (1332579), RAFVR.
H. R. Willis (741942), RAFVR.
H. Wood (338182).
P. A. Wood (934640), RAFVR.
A. Woodsworth (885729), AAF.
D. R. Woolnough (506286).
G. H. Worlock (515075).
M. W. Young (561755).
R. J. Young (522246).
E. G. Younge (514204).

 Acting Warrant Officers

J. E. Brazier (569904).
E. S. Brook (809049), AAF.
B. H. Heyhoe (540558).
E. E. John (506990).
G. T. V. Lawson (163885).
A. D. Loten (591007).
H. Maudsey (362428).
A. W. Prangnell (560177).
E. Taylor (534699).
R. B. H. Thompson (353799).
T. J. Woodcock (1169941), RAFVR.

 Flight Sergeants

1265217 R. F. Addison, RAFVR.
750048 T. H. Albury, RAFVR.
540929 H. Alker.
510290 G. E. Allman.
528661 J. G. S. Anderson.
1009763 W. G. D. M. Anderson, RAFVR.
1318341 J. E. Ash, RAFVR.
359978 J. W. Ashby.
1394802 R. W. Ashman, RAFVR.
565060 J. Ashmore.
1335873 W. A. Atkins, RAFVR.
1390754 F. P. Averill, RAFVR.
1610749 G. C. Baker, RAFVR.
610496 F. C. Bancroft.
519903 J. H Banks.
507742 W. W. Barber.
1391772 R. A. Barrett, RAFVR.
521507 C. J. Bartlett.
565501 A. H. Bartrop.
1808147 R. H. Bateman, DFM, RAFVR.
509276 C. Batty.
526997 J. G. Beckett.
570386 J. Beedle.
506562. F. T Bibey.
534478 E. M. Bickle.
365727 E. W. Billinger.
998097 J. D. Soden-Bird, RAFVR.
565867 H. W. Blackney.
565065 R. S. Blunden.
546264 W. H. G. Bodley.
753579 L. E. Booth, RAFVR.
513496 E. L. Boskett.
568430 P. E. Boult.
411691 J. Bowden.
1893976 D. A. Brett, RAFVR.
1395596 A. V. Bridle, RAFVR.
760638 C. H. Brooks, RAFVR.
563037 J. Brophy.
653957 L. A. Brown.
561471 M. Brown
358739 W. Brown.
529905 J. Buckley.
537124 H. Bullock.
998497 N. H. Bulmer, RAFVR.
509420 P. J. Burke.
882586 T. M. Burke, AAF.
328442 J. S. Burrows.
1107843 T. Burton, RAFVR.
954196 A. Butterworth, RAFVR.
563638 T. Campbell.
636119.A. W. Card.
1014362 J. A. Carter, RAFVR.
531996 W. A. Carter.
743454 J. E. Carver, RAFVR.
250499 R. Catterall.
35915 S. E. Cattermole.
537591 F. R. Chamberlain.
1430560 S. J. Chaisty, RAFVR.
561088 C. Clarke.
241060 G. H. Clarke.
364801 N. C. F. Clay.
550401 R. A. R. Cleverley.
507057 T. S. Cochran.
1580521 T. H. Cockeram, RAFVR.
1334908 R. P. Codd, RAFVR.
522116 R. G. Codling.
1263073 A. O. Coker, RAFVR.
1172612 F. W. Coleman, RAFVR.
354143 S. F. Coleman.
1255059 H. Collett, RAFVR.
804262 E. J. Cole, AAF.
929648 H. R. K. Collingridge, RAFVR.
908318 B. A. Collins, RAFVR.
88957 L. R. Collins, AAF.
616415 W. J. F. Collins.
560568 A. S. Collison.
6989 L. J. Connor.
564159 R. G. Cook.
561074 R. H. Cook.
560050 J. T. Cooke.
265088 C. C. Cooper.
635083 R. W. Cooper.
103968 W. Cooper, RAFVR.
192350 W. H. Cooper.
505247 C. Cosgrove.
366248 S. C. Coulson.
550644 K. V. Coveney.
550328 W. V. Cowdry.
509072 R. F. Crane.
566664 E. F. C. Croucher.
223106 A. E. Daniel.
537124 E. Darbyshire.
1114002 J. R. Dathan, RAFVR.
502400 R. G. Davies.
522305 A. C. Davis.
564152 A. E. Day.
517124 M. S. Day.
567566 K. Dickins.
750901 J. W. Dines, RAFVR.
580051 G. G. Dixon.
97474 R. M. Dixon.
1107303 H. E. Dobson, RAFVR.
756036 T. Dodd, RAFVR.
770488 C. W. Dunn, RAFVR.
352753 R. A. Dunn.
566413 S. F. Dunn.
761401 C. S. Dueling, RAFVR.
1045725, W. J. Eames.
562538 N. J. D. Edwards.
623717 E. G. Ellis.
509686 R. Evans.
347467 W. H. E. Facey.
1511188 T. P. Fargher, RAFVR.
1577470 S. T. Farmiloe.
250674 W. O. Faulkes.
513173 D. Fearnley.
1661231 V. M. Fenn.
563449 R. G. Ferrier.
24212 A. S. Finch.
1445886 H. Finch, RAFVR.
658824 H. Fitton.
567528 J. L. Fitzgerald.
526842 S. E. Fluck.
590811 D. C. Fortesque.
562569 A. H. Foster.
562119 W. A. Foster.
657513 V. R. Fox.
1151940 E. Freer.
364907 N. S. Fuller.
1354976 J. Gascoigne, RAFVR.
1255314 P. Gash, RAFVR.
546083 J. A. T. Gawler.
1176310 W. B. J. Gidley, RAFVR.
799875 A. Gidlow, RAFVR.
560138 C. P. Gilbert.
566310 A. F. Godden.
82898 J. Godley.
505870 D. Golphin.
1258877 J. F. Goddess, RAFVR.
1684259 W. Goriah, RAFVR.
364908 L. R. Gray.
213852 R. G. Gray.
157297 R. S. Green.
1461473 T. J. Green, RAFVR.
1394704 R. A. C. Gregory, RAFVR.
353234 W. P. Hadoon.
1369655 W. Halbert, RAFVR.
517787 S. Hamilton.
1588288 I. Hardman.
1398657 J. Harris, RAFVR.
569253 D. Harrison.
567551 N. O. Harvey.
1133810 F. G. Hazel.
534617 N. C. O. Head.
562098 W. E. Hearn.
970262 W. Hearns, RAFVR.
563005 A. Hedley.
155867 F. C. Heimsath.
746579 A. E. Hewitt, RAFVR.
564216 A. Hewson.
538010 J. C. Hillman.
756064 C. C. Hirst, RAFVR.
525141 R. E. Hoare.
524820 A. Hogben.
562284 F. G. W. Hoile.
562132 J. Hollinshead.
529519 A. J. Holmes.
1322069 J. Holmes.
1238498 V. E. Horn, RAFVR.
357942 J. Horne.
613032 C. F. Horsley.
567341 P. S. Hose.
568365 D. J. Hoskins.
365743 L. F. Hotham.
330296 G. I. Hounam.
896028 M. L. Houston, AAF.
523443 F. Howes.
770732 H. J. Huggett, RAFVR.
364098 W. C. Hutchins.
1067234 A. Hutchinson, RAFVR.
631668 C. H. Izard.
518850 H. C. Jeckells.
750011 A. J. Jenkins, RAFVR.
357076 H. Jenner.
511094 C. I. John.
512215 G. John.
509518 A. G. A. Johnson.
759289 G. H. E. Johnson, RAFVR.
540983 R. C. R. Johnston.
370843 C. E. Jones.
1103878 E. M. Jones, RAFVR.
507925 J. F. Jones.
352168 J. E. Kaye.
997811 A. S. H. Keightley, RAFVR.
950044 G. King, RAFVR.
618053 R. W. Lace.
363434 C. B. Lacey.
526073 W. P. Laity.
1178376 F. H. Lawrence, RAFVR.
1151598 E. G. Lee, RAFVR.
326537 E. G. Lee.
1176833 R. A. Lister, RAFVR.
1205088 S. J. Loader, RAFVR.
565185 H. V. Lonnon.
538398 D. J. Loudon.
516808 E. N. Love.
641662 H. D. R. Lovitt.
566323 W. F. T. Lucas.
560653 G. D. Lumsden.
1158778 A. H. Lunn, RAFVR.
568601 W. H. Mcdonald.
344459 H. W. T. Mcfarlane.
349568. R. D. McIntosh.
366340 T A. McIntyre.
5548 A. S. Mackenzie.
365301 H. B. Mack.
532631 J. R. Mainwaring.
531933 W. Maskill.
1469853 E. J. Maslin, RAFVR.
562583 A. E. Mayall.
506658 R. T. A. Medway.
565918 R. I. Mee.
969998 N G. Mason, RAFVR.
1295938 J. R. Michell, RAFVR.
508972 V. F. Mitchell.
564799 H. Monkman.
563486 F. J. Moreman.
539325 J. R. Morgan.
563672 W. M. T. Morgan.
986770 G. L. Moses, RAFVR.
936790 P. J. Mulbregt, RAFVR.
533250 G. H. Mummery.
564037 J. P. Murphy.
551236 L. A. Myers.
1175345 W. Nesbitt, RAFVR.
157993 E. C. W. Nicholls.
1801886 J. S. Norris, RAFVR.
517063 T. E. Nugent.
591014 W. J. Nye.
560186 J. M. O'Connor.
349188 E. O'Donnell.
808279 P. O'Donnell, AAF.
507114 T. W. Oxberry.
1113490 G. Owen, RAFVR.
1126532 J. T. Partridge, RAFVR.
1026066 I. Paton, RAFVR.
1075398 T, Patterson, RAFVR.
566195 N. H. Pearce.
619433 C. Pitchford.
338218 D. H. Please.
613705 N. W. Pollard.
511548 A. G. Powley.
567024 F. R. Pratt.
1201410 A. G. Presland, RAFVR.
1259083 C. G. Priest, RAFVR.
516455 E. Priestley.
896988 J. Proctor, AAF.
977013 J. L. Purdy, RAFVR.
1586404 A. J. Purnell, RAFVR.
519120 C. Pye.
533172 W. J. Quinn.
881690 K. S. Rayer, AAF.
1621358 R. W. Raysom, RAFVR.
924984 C. G. Reat, RAFVR.
564003 H. Rees.
647988 G. Reid.
512878 J. Rennison.
521885 R. Renton.
1586587 E. J. Reynolds, RAFVR.
525861 C. Ridley.
973735 W. Rigby, RAFVR.
334338 A. Roberts.
1179561 P. Roberts, RAFVR.
803293 J. M. Robertson, AAF.
591116 R. Robertson.
1078815 W. Robinson, RAFVR.
1061430 K. W. Rolls, RAFVR.
620332 W. J. Rousseau.
1391469 J. T. Rowles, RAFVR.
770377 S. Ruff, RAFVR.
328657 H. C. Russell.
1346184 M. H. Sakol, RAFVR.
566588 J. H. Salt.
1177489 F. R. Sambrook, RAFVR.
561626 K. G. Saunders.
991609 C. Scothern, RAFVR.
1695860 A. G. M. Scott, RAFVR.
366378 L. A. Scott.
760084 J. H. Seddon, RAFVR.
916382 E. C. Selfe, RAFVR.
646806 A. Senior.
562315 A. Severn.
523953 T. Shannon.
841649 A. Sharp, AAF.
939150 W. Shaw, RAFVR.
565828 E. W. Shorthouse.
912433 L. F. G. Silk, RAFVR.
535049 D. E. Simons.
566755 R. A. Simpson.
568309 A. A. Smith.
549596 G. A. Smith.
630516 G. A. Smith.
563992 G. J. Smith.
551322 W. G. Smith.
1365412 P. C. Somers, RAFVR.
1607026-3. R. W. Soper, RAFVR.
518414 A. Spooner.
364733 W. Springate.
515546 L. G. Steele.
1284255 R. C. Stone, RAFVR.
947474 J. Stott, RAFVR.
565665 W. S. Strickland.
411330 A. E. Stuchbury.
635500 F. A. Sullman.
516633 E. J. Swallow.
979671 H. A. Swift, RAFVR.
1334160 D. F. Tams, RAFVR.
563276 C. Tattersall.
1865913 S. A. J. Taylor, RAFVR.
626891 A. C. Teskey.
359553 A. G. Tester.
744374 J. E. Thake, RAFVR.
1104574 D. Thomas, RAFVR.
539226 R. V. Thomas.
560931 D. Thompson.
1159219 F. T. Thompson, RAFVR.
529584 C F. Thomson.
893238 M D. Thorburn, AAF.
847527 P. J. Thornton, AAF.
329343 T. Thornton.
535874 J. Thwaite.
519148 M. E. Tilling.
894741 I. M. Timms, RAFVR.
550559 A. H. Tipton.
352331 F. A. Todd.
570436 A. F. Tokeley.
525601 K. R. Tomkins.
1568840 P. Toner, RAFVR.
567317 L. A. Tovey.
626458 R. L. Travers.
740099 F. M. Trier, RAFVR.
659170 E. Turner.
335730 J. Turner.
359820 L. S. Turner.
564397 R. F. Twigg.
1323136 L. R. Underwood, RAFVR.
530508 D. Valentine.
572085 R. McD. Veitch.
562938 P. C. Vigar.
516823 H. Waddington.
937630 T. E. Wagstaff, RAFVR.
563308 F. Watte.
934912 F. Walker, RAFVR.
537369 E. Wallwork.
366478 A. E. Walter.
329792 E. H. Walker.
522128 T. P. Walker.
106770 A. E. Waller.
1624186 A. W. Warburton, RAFVR.
1213616 S. H. Waring, RAFVR.
510653 R. P. Watkin.
1562725 R. A. Watson, RAFVR.
10592 R. J. Watson.
991028 T. A. Watson, RAFVR.
1232150 C. Watts, RAFVR.
1522803 P. I. Watts, RAFVR.
539370 E. Webster.
335793 W. L. Whenlock.
565047 J. T. WlLdman.
1549414 T. Wilks, RAFVR.
902036 C. G. Willett, RAFVR.
1621238 C. A. Williams, RAFVR.
1312245 F. A. Wiltshire, RAFVR.
520159 J. P. Winspear.
353703 J. Withers.
544096 A. H. Woollard.
1006450 H. J. Wood, RAFVR.
1321252 R. Wood, RAFVR.
566429 C. Wright.
569208 I. A. Wright.
1261320 L. F. R. Yeo.
359783 G. H. Yockney.
364745 R. J. Young.
1870237 W. B. Young, RAFVR.

 Acting Flight Sergeants

770115 W. Allan, RAFVR.
1357731 R. H. Amis, RAFVR.
336726 E. Bemrose.
523640 R. Bill.
548657 S. E. E. Bint.
973354 A. F. W. Bradley, RAFVR.
338312 M. F. Brereton.
622755 E. J. Briggs.
510562 E. A. Chaplin.
1258635 F. M. Cockcroft, RAFVR.
753245 H. J Connorton, RAFVR.
523268 J. Crabtree.
974367 W. E. Cramb, RAFVR.
970370 C. E. Dawkins, RAFVR.
1309633 W. Dixon, RAFVR.
632477 P. Docherty.
753656 E. W L. Edwards, RAFVR.
1053038 H. C. Healey, RAFVR.
1629211 C. Hancock, RAFVR.
359114 S. F. Hare.
1365750 M. Hoses, RAFVR.
1159488 R. E. Jefferies, RAFVR.
455960 R. E. Marr-Johnson.
230861 J. H. Knight.
1122444 A. L. K. Lamb, RAFVR.
702156 C. A. Lambert, RAFVR.
956423 A. G. Levitt, RAFVR.
411373 G. H. Longhurst.
1000286 J. H. Mann, RAFVR.
252850 H. A. Marsh.
2099855 M. M. Marson, RAFVR.
591403 N. E. Notley.
349873 W. F. T. Peall.
529366 L. Pearce.
551217 G. O. Pryce.
3566608 C. W. Roden.
756055 C. J. Rowlinson, RAFVR.
1106380 J. C. Scott, RAFVR.
1310904 T. A. Stewart, RAFVR.
530393 J. L. Stringfellow.
989083 D. H. M. Terras, RAFVR.
917350 B. G. Thornton, RAFVR.
1192518 W. Tuke, RAFVR.
634860 V. J. T. Vine.
1211065 A. Warden, RAFVR.
925654 W. H. Williams, RAFVR.
1283776 L. A. Woodford, RAFVR.
1554084 T. H. Woods, RAFVR.
1044278 D. Wright, RAFVR.
907275 R. E. Young, RAFVR.

 Sergeants

568429 L. S. Abbott.
570093 R. Alford.
1356254 A. E. Allen, RAFVR.
591886 L. G. Allen.
1301073 T. Allen, RAFVR.
1199065 J. F. Andrew, RAFVR.
914275 R. A. Archer, RAFVR.
1368506 J. W. Armstrong, RAFVR.
105292. F. W. Arthur.
353200 E. H. Ashley.
516648 R. F.Ashton.
1054829 S. G. Ashworth, RAFVR.
1004931 E. Aspinall, RAFVR.
1003845 T. Atkinson, RAFVR.
1831050 G. R. C. Aylward, RAFVR.
1168793 J. Baggott, RAFVR.
625243 J. Baird.
1053785 W. R. Baird, RAFVR.
1477538 H. C. Baker, RAFVR.
1239192 J. Baker, RAFVR.
1353953 S. A. Baker, RAFVR.
972363 A. Ball, RAFVR.
928241 G. H. Ball, RAFVR.
1406491 R. Banbury, RAFVR.
522793 T. A. F. Banks.
529992 J. Bann.
1336395 W. T. Bannar, RAFVR.
1305418 G. E. Bass, RAFVR.
1474098 W. W. Bateson, RAFVR.
534549 O. Baum.
775398 H. Bauman, RAFVR.
6568 A. H. Bax.
521416 R. C. Baxter.
1254335 W. W. Beagley, RAFVR.
1203156 L. E. Beastall, RAFVR.
1356948 L. F. Beckett, RAFVR.
1190143 R. C. Beek, RAFVR.
1193510 A. H. Bell, RAFVR.
912879 N. Bell, RAFVR.
573211 P. R. Bennedik.
1063396 G. Bennett, RAFVR.
903912 R. D. Bennett, RAFVR.
2221150 W. G. Bennett, RAFVR.
1641605 W. Bentley, RAFVR.
1630033 A. W. S. Bevis, RAFVR.
903500 W. R. Birbeck, RAFVR.
1300088 J. E. V. Birch, RAFVR.
913476 F. H. Bishop, RAFVR.
1177292 H. C. Blackborow, RAFVR.
945947 T. H. Blackburn, RAFVR.
937986 E. D. Blackwell, RAFVR.
1378451 R. Blamires, RAFVR.
1429943 T. A. Blewett, RAFVR.
528431 H. G. Bloom.
771014 E. W. Blowman, RAFVR.
903838 H. C. W. Blundell, RAFVR.
346599 P. F. Blythe.
992788 J. B. McI. Bolam, RAFVR.
1446978 E. L. Bond, RAFVR.
568059 E. Border.
920111 C Bowden, RAFVR.
1172618 R. W. Bowring, RAFVR.
335217 L. Boxall.
1613044 D. H. Bradbury, RAFVR.
1207234 S. T. Brennan, RAFVR.
1411429 E. Brenner, RAFVR.
760050 E. A. Bridgett, RAFVR.
519576 E. J. Briscoe.
544701 S. G. Briscoe.
548244 S. Brookfield.
335096 W. E. Brooks.
969432 D. Brown, RAFVR.
815127 F. D. Brown, AAF.
955512 F. W. Brown.
640316 R. L. Brown.
1673608 E. J. Budd, RAFVR.
1155193 R. W. Bull, RAFVR.
591883 A. E. Bullivent.
1156884 N. H. Bumstead, RAFVR.
542951 J. H. Bunyard.
283590 F. Burbidge.
701601 F. E. Burnett, RAFVR.
954146 G. Burt, RAFVR.
553229 C. Bushell.
743819 F. T. Butchart, RAFVR.
352866 B. F. Butler.
1357496 N. H. Butler, RAFVR.
1622891 J. A. Byrne, RAFVR.
625449 J. T. Cairns.
956353 A. J. Camp, RAFVR.
1681965 W. Campbell, RAFVR.
567478 W. C. Canton.
701616 T. Carlyle, RAFVR.
915126 B. J. W. Carter, RAFVR.
355780 H. E. Carter.
1853248 D. Cattle, RAFVR.
520367 C. A. Cave.
1619432 R. W. Cavender, RAFVR.
1034406 F. C. Challands, RAFVR.
1063048 P. B. Chamberlain, RAFVR.
610038 A. L. Chichester.
623705 G. T Chrisp.
1067729 W. Christopherson, RAFVR.
632984 A. Chrystall.
569655 B. A. Church.
1222928 D. L. Church, RAFVR.
1251213 J. H. Churchill, RAFVR.
610263 R. G. Churchill.
1041510 L. H. B. Clamp, RAFVR.
1197874 R. S. Clark, RAFVR.
1010618 F. Clarke, RAFVR.
1259625 R. Clarke, RAFVR.
1875228 D. P. Cockle, RAFVR.
1256329 S. J. Cocksworth, RAFVR.
1215167 F. A. J. Coldwell, RAFVR.
770779 D. F. E. Coles, RAFVR.
1168681 G. Collins, RAFVR.
1392410 R. G. Collins, RAFVR.
566662 T. Connor, AAF.
1154110 E. G. Cook, RAFVR.
743986 L. C. F. Cook, RAFVR.
1257467 C. H. Cooksey.
1487191 L. A. Cookson, RAFVR.
1595345 D. C. Cooper, RAFVR.
546964 H. W. Cooper.
1153533 R. C. K. Cope, RAFVR.
617106 D. Corbett.
523289 E. Cosher.
990974 F. Cottam, RAFVR.
1095250 H. Y. Cousens, RAFVR.
1824595 J. N. Cowan, RAFVR.
1119603 J. Cowie, RAFVR.
1253331 L. A. Cowley, RAFVR.
1200336 A. C. Cranfield, RAFVR.
1326767 R. M. Cribb, RAFVR.
1004776 J. I. Crichton, RAFVR.
988342 W. Croft, RAFVR.
924872 D. C. Crooke, RAFVR.
1208768 L. J. Crosby, RAFVR.
618812 E. Cross.
1474141 H. Crowther, RAFVR.
755085 H. C. Crowther, RAFVR.
1670847 W. J. Crowther, RAFVR.
1100694 J. Cruise, RAFVR.
1.112847 G. H. Cullum, RAFVR.
545296 V. J. Cunningham.
1352437 L. Currie, RAFVR.
567508 E. E. Curtis.
1312861 E. P. Curtis, RAFVR.
531478 J. Cuthbert.
338172 C. R. Cutter.
1274762 W. F. Dadds, RAFVR.
520577 A. B. Daines.
571843 G. H. Dalton.
1191794 T. M. M. Daly, RAFVR.
551225 H. J. Daplyn.
1067580 T. Dargavel, RAFVR.
632512 B. Davies.
1103355 C. Davies, RAFVR.
572289 O. Davies.
618851 R. Davies.
1201910 R. L. Davies.
1116294 G. H. J. Davis, RAFVR.
1600962 G. W. Davis, RAFVR.
1265288 R. W. G. Day, RAFVR.
1159515 E. F. Deacon, RAFVR.
1156317 H. J. Deakin, RAFVR.
1084356 C. H. Dean, RAFVR.
1123246 H. Dean, RAFVR.
1509827 G. N. Debenham, RAFVR.
442032 J. B. Dell.
544770 R. E. S. De Naeyer.
1217036 G. W. Dennis, RAFVR.
614648 N. C. Devereux.
531302 G. H. Dewar.
1672409 J. McN. Dick, RAFVR.
906328 D. I. Dickie, RAFVR.
750402 H. J. Dix, RAFVR.
617662 A. K. Dinham.
991093 E. Dobson, RAFVR.
1256324 J. S. Dockerill, RAFVR.
1597119 W. H. Donaldson, RAFVR.
621303 G. Donnally.
346508 C. B. Dore.
525084 T. Drummond.
63047 F. C. Dryden.
807266 W. Dryden, RAFVR.
643310 A. Dugdale.
1582432 E. G. Durland, RAFVR.
744607 H. Dutton, RAFVR.
985336 R. P. Dye, RAFVR.
924413 C. G. H. Earl, RAFVR.
1384713 B. V. Eckbery, RAFVR.
1160505 C. Edwards, RAFVR.
1176075 F. R. Edwards, RAFVR.
647814 O. W. Edwards.
1137617 H. Elliott, RAFVR.
982363 G. A. Ellis, RAFVR.
701440 J. Ellis, RAFVR.
1326650 F. C. Emerson, RAFVR.
1076234 A. J. England, RAFVR.
974781 E. W. English, RAFVR.
635662 J. R. B. Ensor.
1180430 H. J. Eustace, RAFVR.
513146 F. G. Evans.
1237642 J. G. Evans, RAFVR.
947528 T. W. Evans, RAFVR.
909259 S. H. M. Everest, RAFVR.
1071176 F. Fagan, RAFVR.
569056 J. Fallon.
1851445 W. W. Farmer, RAFVR.
631820 D. H. Fear.
951662 J. K. Fenton, RAFVR.
933675 E. D. Fernley, RAFVR.
1193046 R. A. Field, RAFVR.
1177824 J. H. Finch, RAFVR.
1368015 J. Findlay, RAFVR.
1242059 F. Ford, RAFVR.
611859 D. W. Forster.
1205057 H. R. Fowler, RAFVR.
649967 F. D. Fox.
1264590 A. G. France, RAFVR.
1372847 J. W. J. Francis, RAFVR.
1490327 L. P. Franke, RAFVR.
542406 S. R. Freeman.
1154011 J. R. Fry, RAFVR.
509192 F. H. Furber.
507586 H. W. Gallop.
987771 E. R. Gamon, RAFVR.
519230 A. T. Gardiner.
348338 W. Gardiner.
1431576 H. S. Gardner, RAFVR.
1153734 P. J. Gatrell, RAFVR.
524901 W. Gault.
405673 C. H. George.
1076340 R. T. W. George, RAFVR.
1179801 M. A. E. Gifford, RAFVR.
1283123 E. C. Gilbert, RAFVR.
928156 O. H. Gilbert, RAFVR.
1252033 D. Gill, RAFVR.
972092 E. P. Gill, RAFVR.
538152 D. Gillies.
1624962 H. Glenny, RAFVR.
749871 S. E. Godley, RAFVR.
1197332 D. J. Golding, RAFVR.
752044 E. J. Gollop, RAFVR.
1119826 P. H. Goodchild, RAFVR.
1350061 D. Goodey, RAFVR.
644782 A. Goodison.
954064 O. T. Gorton, RAFVR.
551254 L. V. S. Gould.
938933 G. A. Grange, RAFVR.
526070 K. L. R. Gray.
1223070 H. G. Green, RAFVR.
626272 J. A. I. Greig.
523685 J. E. Grimwood.
618698 H. G. M. Gross.
569013 F. J. Guthrie.
968943 C. J. Hainge, RAFVR.
563798 W. R. Hall.
1420448 H. W. Halsey, RAFVR.
907108 J. E. Ham, RAFVR.
1555409 D. Hamilton, RAFVR.
1625413 H. L. Hammond, RAFVR.
1181603 S. D. Hammond, RAFVR.
1591980 G. Hand, RAFVR.
566513 P. G. Hann.
572673 M. B. S. Hanworth.
635647 H. R. Harding.
1254644 A. W. E. Hardwicke, RAFVR.
923691 D. K. Harris, RAFVR.
895619 I. Harrison, AAF.
571360 H. G. Hart.
743642 S. J. Hart, RAFVR.
957561 A. E. Hartshorn, RAFVR.
967722 T. C. Hastie, RAFVR.
914017 A. C. Hathaway, RAFVR.
1021569 J. Hatton, RAFVR.
530008 S. H. Hatton.
1039729 G. E. Haynes, RAFVR.
626150 B. G. Hayward.
918440 G. W. Hayward, RAFVR.
1259387 H. D. Hayward, RAFVR.
996394 J. A. Healey, RAFVR.
1106443 L. Heathfield, RAFVR.
1150813 J. W. Hemley, RAFVR.
1290720 W. L. Herbert, RAFVR.
1104145 S. Heyworth, RAFVR.
1062941 W. Hicks, RAFVR.
1444021 H. J. Hill, RAFVR.
612759 G. M. Hills.
1002955 G. Hindley, RAFVR.
523472 R. Hindshaw.
1533911 D. W. Hiscock, RAFVR.
702261 R. E. Hitchin, RAFVR.
1157070 C. Hobbs, RAFVR.
1329891 E. F. Holdsworth, RAFVR.
981524 J. G. Hole, RAFVR.
546492 L. A. D. Holley.
1302341 L. E. Hollins, RAFVR.
934520 N. G. Hollowell, RAFVR.
1194036 S. G. Holroyd, RAFVR.
801421 G. R. Hopgood, AAF.
1022675 W. Horrobin, RAFVR.
1355544 J. Horton, RAFVR.
1150743 W. H. Horton, RAFVR.
744871 P. H. Howard, RAFVR.
1079622 R. G. Howard, RAFVR.
1360440 W. R. S. Howie, RAFVR.
352984 W. T. Howl.
1513634 R. Hudson, RAFVR.
49647 R. S. Hudson.
340403 W. H. Huggett.
1326655 G. Hughes, RAFVR.
527530 A. D. L. Hulme.
1208693 S. Hurst, RAFVR.
1299601 F. J. Hutchings, RAFVR.
570736 T. D. Ingledow.
900756 E. C. Ingram, RAFVR.
522402 T. A. Ingroville.
1176609 T. Insull, RAFVR.
567118 J. W. Ireland.
932771 A. A. Jackson, RAFVR.
941445 G. E. Jackson, RAFVR.
774766 I. Jacobsen, RAFVR.
1162739 W. W. S. Jagg, RAFVR.
966146 E. H. James, RAFVR.
567974 K. W. James.
841382 N. A. C. James, AAF.
568736 G. M. Jarratt.
979943 H. J. Jenkins, RAFVR.
167276 L. Jennings.
624772 T. Jewell.
365517 C. T. Johns.
567600 A. Johnson.
505003 R. H. Johnson.
1421442 W. H. Johnson, RAFVR.
1062348 A. G. Jones, RAFVR.
956906 E. Jones, RAFVR.
1275873 F. A. Jones, RAFVR.
613651 L. R. Jones.
575583 S. R. Jones.
1060916 W. Jopson, RAFVR.
1453116 R. H. J. Joseph, RAFVR.
1446329 L. B. Journeaux, RAFVR.
1031165 C. F. S. Joyce, RAFVR.
1062477 J. Keeton, RAFVR.
2133047 A. E. Kenny, RAFVR.
546683 F. Kent.
1000518 J. B. T. Kerr, RAFVR.
612581 A. G. Kilby.
955726 J. C. Kilner, RAFVR.
537475 S. T. Kime.
357891 A. F. King.
1161409 D. N. King, RAFVR.
978593 J. R. King, RAFVR.
1629941 A. J. Kingham, RAFVR.
1478095 K. Kirby, RAFVR.
336950 E. Kirkham.
1182893 D. J. Kirton, RAFVR.
984077 I. Kitchener, RAFVR.
989486 J. Knaggs, RAFVR.
976490 D. H. Knight, RAFVR.
1241778 E. H. Ladbrooke, RAFVR.
911852 L. E. Laidlaw, RAFVR.
1009144 G. A. Laking, RAFVR.
757021 C. W. Lambert, RAFVR.
520490 R. Landamore.
1257969 E. E. Lane, RAFVR.
770705 F. E. Lane, RAFVR.
1153456 S. G. Large, RAFVR.
744834 W. Lawrence, RAFVR.
651849 J. B. Layton.
917437 A. L. Leeson, RAFVR.
1249368 E. Leigh, RAFVR.
1815943 K. W. R. Lester, RAFVR.
641542 H. Lewin.
962814 E. J. Lidstone, RAFVR.
610947 D. Lindsay.
570206 S. A. Lister.
1353110 K. Lloyd, RAFVR.
1067581 V. Logan, RAFVR.
1603850 J. S. Loomes, RAFVR.
1800942 H. J. Lorkin, RAFVR.
907078 F. Loveless, RAFVR.
982450 A. Lowe, RAFVR.
941155 S. B. Lowe, RAFVR.
972931 G. E. Lowery, RAFVR.
1143216 A. W. Lumb, RAFVR.
628616 F. Lynch.
534445 J. M. Lynn.
612174 L. Lyons.
1018426 I. McArdle, RAFVR.
1080502 H. McBride, RAFVR.
744394 C. McCartney, RAFVR.
533867 G. McChesney.
550202 E. L. MacDonald.
771322 G. B. W. McDonald, RAFVR.
1056158 J. Macdonald, RAFVR.
769770 J. MacDonald, RAFVR.
624817 G. R. McDowall.
533000 G. J. McFarlane.
992093 W. MacGregor, RAFVR.
770723 A. D. McInnes, RAFVR.
1011812 A. McLean, RAFVR.
534963 H. McLean
636109 H. McLean.
1542856 J. C. McManus, RAFVR.
916326 D. J. Major, RAFVR.
845851 D. E. Mann, AAF.
959639 E. Mannaghan, RAFVR.
1232650 K. Markland, RAFVR.
550256 H. Marsden.
1186187 L. M. W. Marshall, RAFVR.
1080799 T. Marshall, RAFVR.
574309 R. H. Mason.
1529993 J. F. Matthews, RAFVR.
1656373 D. J. Maxwell, RAFVR.
542509 H. Mellor.
962397 P. Millidge, RAFVR.
918104 A. B. Mills, RAFVR.
631673 K. H. Miroy.
1294480 E. Mitchell, RAFVR.
966498 G. W. Mitchell, RAFVR.
911284 R. Mitchell, RAFVR.
935426 A. Moore, RAFVR.
1121083 H. Moore, RAFVR.
1223219 P. O. Moore, RAFVR.
1171603 D. E. T. Morgan, RAFVR.
639953 A. E. Moss.
1002091 R. W. T. Mowtell, RAFVR.
523578 L. J. Movers.
997940 R. H. Mullen, RAFVR.
1866547 A. J. Mullord, RAFVR.
912557 P. R. Mully, RAFVR.
1568522 J. W. Mungo, RAFVR.
1171831 W. Munroe, RAFVR.
1176618 D. Nash, RAFVR.
1149441 E. L. Naylor, RAFVR.
802356 F. T. Nelson, AAF.
590772 R. Nicholson.
1326760 K. A. Nicol, RAFVR.
537754 A. A. Norris, RAFVR.
919780 H. F. Norris, RAFVR.
567094 R. H. Norris.
943673 A. E. Nunneley, RAFVR.
746421 H. J. Oaten, RAFVR.
747340 E. R. O'Brien, RAFVR.
960422 W. L. Oliver, RAFVR.
328335 W. C. Olivie.
1174588 S. O'Neill, RAFVR.
760802 C. A. Ormesher, RAFVR.
902963 W. B. Osborne, RAFVR.
1250903 F. L. Packard, RAFVR.
1463432 C. W. Pain, RAFVR.
642409 A. L. Park.
1600876 R. E. D. Parker, RAFVR.
512939 G. H. Partridge.
1557969 J. R. Parvin, RAFVR.
752168 C. A. Patman, RAFVR.
1188075 A. G. Patten, RAFVR.
922471 E. C. Pearce, RAFVR.
568377 E. J. Pearson.
974829 R. G. Peel, RAFVR.
1536797 E. H. Peers, RAFVR (deceased).
1192377 A. Peggs, RAFVR.
1181772 E. H. A. Penn, RAFVR.
1420241 H. E. Phillips, RAFVR.
511783 J. Phillips.
546036 A. N. Pipe.
900415 G. H. Piper, RAFVR.
986149 A. T. Pitt, RAFVR.
702337 A. Platt, RAFVR.
1314113 E. B. W. Poole, RAFVR.
971371 P. Porter, RAFVR.
1213947 L. N. Poulter, RAFVR.
751672 N. R. Powell, RAFVR.
47295 E. O. J. Prangnell.
1005245 E. P. Prentice, RAFVR.
564778 D. S. Price.
1171748 H. E. Price, RAFVR.
570743 H. J. Pringle.
920249 J. Prissell, RAFVR.
1191010 G. A. R. Pritchard, RAFVR.
358187 W. R. Pruden.
550996 L. A. Pullen.
292816 A. F. Raffe.
1012577 C. E. Ralph, RAFVR.
351996 H. T. Ralph.
591808 R. Ralph.
906577 A. E. J. Rank, RAFVR.
1058598 W. F. Reddington, RAFVR.
905878 R. V. C. Reed, RAFVR.
771533 B. A. E. Rees, RAFVR.
1193895 D. E. Rees, RAFVR.
969295 G. L. Rees, RAFVR.
1196437 A. J. A. Reynolds, RAFVR.
1253996 F. Ribbons, RAFVR.
1081723 C. Richardson, RAFVR.
634151 F. W. Richardson.
1473803 J. E. Richardson, RAFVR.
1192203 H. J. G. Riches, RAFVR.
1068179 J. M. Rimmer, RAFVR.
1173085 N. H. Rippon, RAFVR.
1083639 R. W. Risby, RAFVR.
518925 F. Roberts.
757426 H. D. Roberts, RAFVR.
743108 F. G. Robertson, RAFVR.
421650 V. E. Roberson.
617643 F. E. F. Robins.
9*5353 C. E. Rodgers, RAFVR.
993997 E. Rose, RAFVR.
642768 J. Rotherham.
1190752 B. K. Rowell, RAFVR.
352045 W. A. L. Roxburgh.
1054763 A. D. Royle, RAFVR.
1179926 W. H. Rubidge, RAFVR.
702838 D. F. Russell, RAFVR.
1148471 R. E. Ryder, RAFVR.
1673116 G. E. Salisbury, RAFVR.
1136981 F. K. Sansam, RAFVR.
1310398 J. R. Sargent. RAFVR.
1506467 C. Saunders, RAFVR.
613189 R. F. Saunders.
1230064 E. P. Savage, RAFVR.
1525040 J. R. Sayers, RAFVR.
1222725 S. Sayers, RAFVR.
746473 W. Scobie, RAFVR.
1505228 T. Scorah, RAFVR.
1108005 C. M. Scotford, RAFVR.
940512 P. R. Scott, RAFVR.
541771 E. F. Sedgwick.
2220714 E. S. Shaw, RAFVR.
1110486 C. Shepherd, RAFVR.
749166 C. G. Short, RAFVR.
1252356 G. S. Short, RAFVR.
1235255 D. C. Shrubshall, RAFVR.
1505228 G. W. Siddons, RAFVR.
923322 R. E. Slade, RAFVR.
1535622 J. Slater, RAFVR.
921598 F. J. Slatter, RAFVR.
1890323 E. A. Slaughter, RAFVR.
1124972 R. B. Smart, RAFVR.
975800 C. F. Smith, RAFVR.
538512 G. Smith.
889987 J. R. Smith, AAF.
1028205 P. Smith, RAFVR.
953584 R. Smith, RAFVR.
1260559 S. J. Smith, RAFVR.
645740 W. J. P. Smith.
744872 W. R. E. Smith, RAFVR.
1024251 C. Snape, RAFVR.
1181323 J. Sparks, RAFVR.
1017662 T. E. Sparrow, RAFVR.
972356 R. Spence, RAFVR.
924174 W. Spencer, RAFVR.
1086607 H. L. Spicer, RAFVR.
904980 A. E. Springett, RAFVR.
918039 R. W. Stalley, RAFVR.
810177 A. Stananought, AAF.
939843 C. R. Stead, RAFVR.
1134358 C. J. Stebbings, RAFVR.
1017896 F. W. E. Stelling, RAFVR.
637071 H. J. Stephens.
1193654 S. E. Stevens, RAFVR.
1073995 A. McK. Stewart, RAFVR.
631888 J. Stewart.
993374 R. J. Stewart, RAFVR.
1126836 C. H. Stitt, RAFVR.
550486 A. W. Stokes.
812309 R. E. Stokes, AAF.
547845 B. R. Stott.
530139 J. M. Stradling.
349258 J. Strange.
1282456 A. Stringer, RAFVR.
1696993 D. C. Stuchbery, RAFVR.
1159193 P. B. Sudbury, RAFVR.
572187 J. A. Sulway.
568178 T. R. Sumner.
1179667 E. J. Sweatman, RAFVR.
775439 O. K. Taglicht, RAFVR.
1602696 D. L. Tams, RAFVR.
1296478 F. A. R. Tarling, RAFVR.
545241 G. Tasker.
60553 E. Taylor.
921795 H. N. Taylor, RAFVR.
948969 J. Taylor, RAFVR.
1090432 W. A. Taylor, RAFVR.
1250259 R. H. Terry, RAFVR.
1203857 A. Thackwray, RAFVR.
982250 J. V. Thomas, RAFVR.
527150 T. W. Thomas.
1676721 M. H. Thomlinson, RAFVR.
10 53557 A. Thompson, RAFVR.
1654542 H. K. Thompson, RAFVR.
1068090 J. K. Thompson, RAFVR.
986871 J. W. Thompson, RAFVR.
1428763 R. C. Thomson, RAFVR.
526111 N. S. Thornburn.
357330 R. R. H. Thynne.
944112 J. Townley, RAFVR.
648928 R. A. Trayling.
1063327 P. D. Tredger, RAFVR.
518043 A. C. Trendall.
1186916 E. D. Trevenna, RAFVR.
50534 V. M. Trigg, RAFVR.
851338 W. W. Trubody, AAF.
953307 E. Trueman, RAFVR.
511566 W. J. Tyler.
481940 M. M. Tucker.
338221 A. W. Turley.
1824835 N. Turnbull, RAFVR.
370483 E. J. F. Turner.
1008733 H. Tyler, RAFVR.
1048930 P. Usher, RAFVR.
1442702 V. E. Valchera, RAFVR.
566651 W. F. Vart.
526695 E. H. Villa.
566910 R. J. Vittle.
1495691 J. M. Wadsworth, RAFVR.
1060311 N. Wainwright, RAFVR.
353771 S. Wakeman.
1048063 R. W. Waldwyn, RAFVR.
1168297 L. Walmsley, RAFVR.
1161839 R. S. Walsh, RAFVR.
520483 H. A. W. Walters.
1408297 W. H. A. Walters, RAFVR.
1713523 J. L Wang, RAFVR.
545279 C. J. R. Ward.
950806 W. P. Ward, RAFVR.
1054080 J. V. Wardell, RAFVR.
620722 C. F. Wasley.
771072 W. Watchorn, RAFVR.
1105312 H. C. Waterhouse, RAFVR.
1375575 G. T. Watson, RAFVR.
914296 L. Watson, RAFVR.
1577639 C. D. Watts, RAFVR.
1591662 J. A. Waugh, RAFVR.
I197119 J. Weatherill, RAFVR.
1053129 F. Weaver, RAFVR.
1163558 W. H. Webb, RAFVR.
1544408 C. D. Weetman, RAFVR.
546634 A. S. Weller.
901962 G. A. Weller, RAFVR.
1004062 L. A. Wellings, RAFVR.
1007899 S. Westgate, RAFVR.
1304509 C. V. Westley, RAFVR.
535866 S. I. Westwood.
910899 E. F. Wheal, RAFVR.
1197119 C. S. Whitby, RAFVR.
1442953 B. White, RAFVR.
60729 E. White.
912325 H. A. White, RAFVR.
749927 H. J. White, RAFVR.
356622 J. E. White.
926434 T. W. White, RAFVR.
1436432 F. A. Whitmarsh, RAFVR.
1421165 K. G. Whitney, RAFVR.
1180306 N. T. Whitsey, RAFVR.
964495 R. R. Wickenden, RAFVR.
1182238 F. W. Wickins, RAFVR.
989523 S. Wiggins, RAFVR.
744793 E. Wilburn, RAFVR.
1029963 J. Wilding, RAFVR.
1202231 J. T. N. Wildman, RAFVR.
526477 J. E. Wiles.
634958 A. A. G. Williams.
619599 C. E. Williams.
1830460 E. O. Williams, RAFVR.
974991 G. Williams, RAFVR.
1182030 H. E. Williams, RAFVR.
1486153 H. L. Williams, RAFVR.
1008477 T. Williamson.
1178963 F. E. Willis, RAFVR.
1128665 A. Wilson, RAFVR.
980627 A. H. M. Wilson, RAFVR.
902071 A. J. Wilson, RAFVR.
840909 S. C. Winters, AAF.
1798649 T. F. Winters, RAFVR.
1445410 L. C. Withers, RAFVR.
918323 W. R. Wixey, RAFVR.
756245 L. G. Woodland, RAFVR.
980979 J. R. Woods, RAFVR.
1288740 C. H. Woodward, RAFVR.
962332 G. W. Worth, RAFVR.
972868 G. Wright, RAFVR.
760186 B. W. Wynn, RAFVR.
1514299 H. A. Yeo, RAFVR.
1266654 J. E. Zerfass, RAFVR.

 Acting Sergeants

947248 S. A. Morris, RAFVR.
1511282. M. Phillips, RAFVR.
1193209 F. A. Savery, RAFVR.
1299207 F. E. Westlake, RAFVR.
611236 T. W. Woods.

 Corporals

1378479 J. W. Abbey, RAFVR.
543740 D. W. Adam, RAFVR.
1275969 F. J. Adams, RAFVR.
1110423 W. Adams, RAFVR.
1187023 A. C. Agg, RAFVR.
1530930 B. Akers, RAFVR.
1045881 G. C. Akrill, RAFVR.
1335702 A. D. Aldridge, RAFVR.
950881 D. B. Allen, RAFVR.
1404040 H. Allen, RAFVR.
938161 G. E. Allkins, RAFVR.
120169 J. A. Andrew, RAFVR.
1024773 T. Andrew, RAFVR.
1452734 G. T. Armitage, RAFVR.
1801132 W. F. Armitage, RAFVR.
1257401 J. F. Armour, RAFVR.
1266302 E. C. Arnold, RAFVR.
747056 L. V. Arnold, RAFVR.
619658 J. E. Ashton.
1107681 J. N. Atkins.
1038500 H. Austin, RAFVR.
1223445 A. F. J. Avis, RAFVR.
1463790 H. C. Baker, RAFVR.
1146629 W. J. Bakewell, RAFVR.
1387382 W. J. Baldwin, RAFVR.
637205 G. T. Ball.
1261000 J. R. Ball, RAFVR.
918688 D. Ballard, RAFVR.
1179479 E. Banks, RAFVR.
1617684 L. A. Barnden, RAFVR.
1278600 J. Barnes, RAFVR.
1653173 F. J. Bajrrett, RAFVR.
1524728 G. E. Barritt, RAFVR.
1154772 A. E. Bartram, RAFVR.
1466618 S. H. Bartram, RAFVR.
326018 H. Basham.
902046 W. Batley, RAFVR.
1281113 R. A. Baugh, RAFVR.
1368012 M. W. G. Baxter, RAFVR.
627383 J. W. Beardsley.
2040403 M. A. Beattie, RAFVR.
1487816 T. Beattie, RAFVR.
1481676 S. Beaumont, RAFVR.
1133255 F. A. G. Belcher, RAFVR.
1064848 A. M. Bell, RAFVR.
928221 G. H. Benn, RAFVR.
940085 E. J. Bennett, RAFVR.
530621 P. N. Bennett.
1197355 T. Bennett, RAFVR.
1172733 W. F. Bennett, RAFVR.
956049 H. Benson, RAFVR.
908222 J. Bernardes, RAFVR.
1000628 L. Berry, RAFVR.
1357312 F. G. Bessant, RAFVR.
1132988 A. Betts, RAFVR.
2066520 E. C. Betts, RAFVR.
1129044 L. P. Bevan, RAFVR.
1164341 B. A. Billington, RAFVR.
1281227 A. R. Billins, RAFVR.
1483535 S. Birchenough, RAFVR.
1557245 J. A. Birnie.
1069744 G. L. Bishop, RAFVR.
1601070 J. P.Bishop, RAFVR.
1202009 H. A. Blake RAFVR.
1241106 A. Bleach, RAFVR.
855105 H. M. Blenkinsop, AAF.
1286245 E. H. Blinkhorn, RAFVR.
1215122 G. F. Bonner, RAFVR.
1165021 B. A. Bosworth, RAFVR.
1497180 G. Bottoms, RAFVR.
577410 C. Bowler.
1086801 A. Bradbury, RAFVR.
743170 A. G. Bradfield, RAFVR.
1027483 W. Bradford, RAFVR.
573853 R. C. T.Brant.
1532447 L. W. Breeze, RAFVR.
1255080 W. J.Brett, RAFVR.
1181811 F. Bridge, RAFVR.
1203451 H. Brock, RAFVR.
1371313 R. A. Brocklesby, RAFVR.
1435572 H. Bromley, RAFVR.
1230733 S. G. Brooker, RAFVR.
1308958 K. A. Brooks, RAFVR.
1566512 C. A. Broqmfield, RAFVR.
958016 D. Broomhead, RAFVR.
1018455 A. B. Brown, RAFVR.
1069779 A. C. Brown, RAFVR.
1043790 E. Brown, RAFVR.
1031175 E. F. Brown, RAFVR.
1055025 H. Brown, RAFVR.
1248353 R. G. Brown, RAFVR.
1104828 W. Brown, RAFVR.
977807 W. N. J. Brownlee, RAFVR.
1019636 F. H. Brumfitt, RAFVR.
1525438 V. Bryan, RAFVR.
1415470 R. C. Bryant, RAFVR.
1173803 H. J. Buck, RAFVR.
1012956 H. Bucher, RAFVR.
1249228 C. W. G. Buglear, RAFVR.
1480975 J. Bullock, RAFVR.
1534973 W. J. Burke, RAFVR.
1169205 H. K. Burley, RAFVR.
1400919 I. Burnett, RAFVR.
1274772 H. J. W. Burns, RAFVR.
2062952 D. M. Burton, RAFVR.
1538946 J. H. Bursell, RAFVR.
1612386 E. B. F. Bussey, RAFVR.
1058843 A. W. H. Butcher, RAFVR.
1015627 E. T. Butcher, RAFVR.
756172 W. B. Butler, RAFVR.
909557 W. S. R. Butler, RAFVR.
507388 H. Byron.
1543725 J. P. Byrne, RAFVR.
1152091 C. S. Cadd, RAFVR.
527995 N. E. J. Caddy.
1054253 J. B. Cahill, RAFVR.
1415905 R. W. Capron, RAFVR.
905634 C. W. Carriage, RAFVR.
1266264 A. C. Carter, RAFVR.
963596 C. H. Carter, RAFVR.
1632016 G. L. Cartlidge, RAFVR.
1012205 F. J. Caton, RAFVR.
1201613 D. Catt, RAFVR.
1138763 W. M. H. Challinor, RAFVR.
951409 C. G. Chambers, RAFVR.
645693 R. E. Champ.
638429 W. L. Channell.
1241116 G. H. P. Chaplin, RAFVR.
537037 F. Chapman.
1110830 G. E. Chapman, RAFVR.
930179 H. F. G. Chapman, RAFVR.
770760 J. Chapman, RAFVR.
1263848 S. S. Charter, RAFVR.
1444220 J. A. Chenery, RAFVR.
1272063 D. H. Child, RAFVR.
1008050 C. J. Clarke, RAFVR.
1464483 T. H. Clarke, RAFVR.
576679 R. J. Cleare.
981604 M. Clennell, RAFVR.
991615 E. Cliff, RAFVR.
1254053 F. G. Cockburn, RAFVR.
1426478 D. L. Coggins, RAFVR.
701159 W. R. Cole, RAFVR.
1186389 A. E. Collins, RAFVR.
1245435 G. H. Collins, RAFVR.
1353728 A. G. F. Compson, RAFVR.
928151 P. D. Cooke, RAFVR.
953725 H. F. Cookson, RAFVR.
1013255 E. Cooper, RAFVR.
1116931 G. W. Cornes, RAFVR.
1287589 T. W. Corrigan, RAFVR.
1102790 H. W. G. Cory, RAFVR.
914817 A. W. Coutanche, RAFVR.
1151941 K. F. Covill, RAFVR.
1098681 A. Cowap, RAFVR.
2202857 A. E. Cox, RAFVR.
1558632. P. Craig, RAFVR.
1254432 F. C. Grain, RAFVR.
938238 D. R. Crawley, RAFVR.
1019511 J. W. Crichton, RAFVR.
1204633 H. E. Crook, RAFVR.
1660563 A. Crossland, RAFVR.
1119386 R. Crossley, RAFVR.
1205959 C. T. Crowe, RAFVR.
1238744 J. W. Crouch, RAFVR.
1224095 W. C. Crisp, RAFVR.
1159639 W. F. Crump, RAFVR.
610909 J. Cummings.
1419592 C. J. H. Curtis, RAFVR.
1258547 F. Cutting, RAFVR.
1464950 L. C. Dale, RAFVR.
1063113 C. S. Dalton, RAFVR.
1552943 J. W. D'Alton, RAFVR.
1087250 H. J. Dance, RAFVR.
1100078 T. Darby, RAFVR.
968077 S. R. D'Arcy, RAFVR.
1100015 F. M. Davenport, RAFVR.
1115186 J. McD. Davidson, RAFVR.
1101562. D. Davies, RAFVR.
1253568 G. T. Davies, RAFVR.
352579 T. D. Davies, RAFVR.
1164730 C. J. Davis, RAFVR.
1461358 S. C. Davis, RAFVR.
1017096 F. Davy, RAFVR.
941405 D. E. Dawkes, RAFVR.
1060723 A. Day, RAFVR.
1055401 A. Dean, RAFVR.
1269503 J. F. Delasalle, RAFVR.
1353977 D. J. Dellar, RAFVR.
941828 E. Denning, RAFVR.
1217582 C. J. W. Denton, RAFVR.
1044790 R. C. Devitt, RAFVR.
330450 L. A. Dexter.
1176792 R. D. Dickerson, RAFVR.
1368689 J. M. Dickie, RAFVR.
1263067 W. Dillon, RAFVR.
922780 H. Dixon, RAFVR.
1058102 J. R. Dixon, RAFVR.
1157198 P. H. Dixon, RAFVR.
1223097 D. S. Dobbing, RAFVR.
974344 A. M. P. Doig, RAFVR.
919047 I C. E. Doman, RAFVR.
554768 W. A. Donaldson, RAFVR.
1174126 D. F. Dorney, RAFVR.
916182. C. J. Draper, RAFVR.
1310842 W. R. E. Drewery, RAFVR.
1066006 K. Drury, RAFVR.
950125 J. C. Duerden, RAFVR.
1120846 J. Dunn, RAFVR.
1325060 S. T. Dunn, RAFVR.
1173685 F. E. Durrant, RAFVR.
902630 D. J. Eaborn, RAFVR.
1676870 J. F. Eadon, RAFVR.
1082155 E. Eaton, RAFVR.
990670 R. Eaves, RAFVR.
1274286 E. C. Edwards, RAFVR.
1028579 H. J. Eglin, RAFVR.
1311676 G. Ellaway, RAFVR.
1113292 W. Ellis, RAFVR.
631232 C. N. England.
1173278 P. F. C. English, RAFVR.
1021114 J. A. Erskine, RAFVR.
929413 E. G. Evans, RAFVR (deceased).
963782 E. M. Evans, RAFVR.
511828 N. A. Evans.
1077139 R. G. Eyres, RAFVR.
954072 R. Fairbairn, RAFVR.
925169 S. E. Faithful, RAFVR.
574053 R. J. Farmer.
932440 R. P. Farrow, RAFVR.
775458 K. Feiler, RAFVR.
1087315 J. W. Fenwick, RAFVR.
1078162 H. Fern, RAFVR.
23273 C. E. Fekrett.
292171 R. W. Finch.
701141 C. R. Fisher, RAFVR.
533710 A. E. J. H. Fitzgerald.
1132658 H. V. Flannery, RAFVR.
1049138 H. Flavell, RAFVR.
921921 J. W. Flay, RAFVR.
1615021 O. W. Fletcher, RAFVR.
926893 W. Flowers, RAFVR.
921300 D. P. Flynn, RAFVR.
915203 R. Fowler, RAFVR.
1316508 J. W. Foxhall, RAFVR.
1621656 J. Freeman, RAFVR.
1151898 H. R. Frosdick, RAFVR.
1273225 W. J. U. Frost, RAFVR.
1200749 H. Fryer, RAFVR.
1259062 O. W. Girdlestone, RAFVR.
1115790 A. Gledhill, RAFVR.
1423331 J. Goddard, RAFVR.
1106302 S. L. Gostling, RAFVR.
1127094 J. H. Gough, RAFVR.
997290 A. Graham, RAFVR.
749065 J. W. Grange, RAFVR.
817088 A. M. Grant, AAF.
1002056 J. C. Grant, RAFVR.
1256028 J. N. Grant, RAFVR.
998361 G. P. Green, RAFVR.
1200778 N. Green, RAFVR.
1118730 S. Green, RAFVR.
924252 B. B. Greenboam, RAFVR.
1417517 A. C. Greeno, RAFVR.
1547343 S. L. Greenwood, RAFVR.
1157416 R. F. Grey, RAFVR.
1356074 D. S. Griffiths, RAFVR.
1151923 R. J. Griffiths, RAFVR.
1187494 R. M. Griffiths, RAFVR.
905453 A. E. J. Grist, RAFVR.
1198052 H. N. W. Grosvenor, RAFVR.
1212668 G. W. Gurr, RAFVR.
990554 E. A. Hadfield, RAFVR.
931359 C. H. Hadley, RAFVR.
614846 W. Hadwin.
1212050 G. H. Hafter, RAFVR.
638291 E. Hagh.
935753 D. H. Halford, RAFVR.
1532073 H. Hall, RAFVR.
1353747 J. A. Hall, RAFVR.
1263087 L. D. Halls, RAFVR.
1310001 J. Halstead, RAFVR.
746116 A. Hamilton, RAFVR.
960683 D. Henderson-Hamilton, RAFVR.
528096 G. H. Hamilton.
639832 W. A. Hamilton.
1121246 E. Hanlon, RAFVR.
1174339 R. C. Hann, RAFVR.
927149 R. V. Harding, RAFVR.
1205617 W. B. Harper, RAFVR.
1674174 C. E. Harris, RAFVR.
1182093 J. Harrison, RAFVR.
577886 J. C. Harrison.
931699 J. R. Harrison, RAFVR.
1208649 S. A. Harrison, RAFVR.
1175521 T. W. Hart, RAFVR.
1669438 S. Harvey, RAFVR.
639128 R. F. Hawes.
1050394 C. Hawksworth, RAFVR.
1121982 T. L. Haycocks, RAFVR.
950547 B. D. Hayes, RAFVR.
1043464 J. G. E. Hayes, RAFVR.
752377 N. S. Hayes, RAFVR.
978214 W. R. Haynes, RAFVR.
1208531 W. Haystead.
1128134 N. Hazzlewood, RAFVR.
1427040 R. A. Healing, RAFVR.
567995 V. St. J. Heggie.
992363 J. Henderson, RAFVR.
892715 H. V. Heryet, AAF.
909696 L. Hewitt, RAFVR.
1644684 E. G. Hewlett, RAFVR.
1101732 C. Heyes, RAFVR.
948945 M. G. High, RAFVR.
1187472 W. W. Hiley, RAFVR.
1479440 D. V. Hill, RAFVR.
844108 A. B. Hillary, AAF.
1456142 L. Hitches, RAFVR.
888879 M. K. Hoar, AAF.
971658 D. A. Hodgkiss, RAFVR.
1052028 P. R. Hogarth, RAFVR.
1346206 D. Holborn, RAFVR.
1005232 S. D. Holdershaw, RAFVR.
1187825 R. J. Hopper, RAFVR.
909354 L. G. Horwood, RAFVR.
1075033 J. Houlding, RAFVR.
1357144 D. Howard, RAFVR.
622269 S. G. Howard.
1081954 J. Howarth, RAFVR.
1521210 J. M. Howat, RAFVR.
1355858 E. J. Howland, RAFVR.
1360491 H. Hubbard, RAFVR.
536975 J. D. Hughes.
981657 W. Y. Hughes, RAFVR.
1449586 E. J. Hunt, RAFVR.
1273179 R. A. Hunt, RAFVR.
476014 J. McL. Hunter.
1699873 J. S. Hunter, RAFVR.
1163868 W. T. L. Huntley, RAFVR.
1270275 C. A. Hutchcroft, RAFVR.
1267093 F. W. J. Hutchins, RAFVR.
1043830 R. V. Ingold, RAFVR.
855015 A. Isaac, AAF.
1088903 L. S. Jackman, RAFVR.
1093507 J. E. Jackson, RAFVR.
1195287 W. O. Jane, RAFVR.
647955 A. F. Jenkinson.
1127794 D, J. John, RAFVR.
611250 D. Johnson.
756574 R. K. Johnson, RAFVR.
1504800 T. H. Johnson, RAFVR.
1292189 R. P. Jonas, RAFVR.
543197 E. Jones.
620334 E. Jones.
1179816 G. E. Jones, RAFVR.
1035934 J. Jones, RAFVR.
1352636 R. Jones, R.A.F. Regt.
909947 R. M. Jones, RAFVR.
746682 N. A. V. Jowitt, RAFVR.
633281 H. Keary.
1072388 P. M. Keir, RAFVR.
1559360 G. J. Keith, RAFVR.
1274351 F. A. Kellaway, RAFVR.
1110522 F. H. Kellaway, RAFVR.
1539011 P. Kelly, RAFVR.
1044805 H. Kennewell, RAFVR.
1134351 G. Kenny, RAFVR.
1146154 J. Kent, RAFVR.
1384589 B. Kerr, RAFVR.
1554039 J. T. Kerr, RAFVR.
614556 R. Kewley.
1240595 R. J. Kiddle, RAFVR.
1266291 R. V. King, RAFVR.
2089361 G. W. Kirk, RAFVR.
1541661 A. Kitching, RAFVR.
1158711 H. C. Knight, RAFVR.
976364 R. F. Knight, RAFVR.
1262229 A. F. Lambert, RAFVR.
635342 L. Lanchester.
850146 R. M. S. Lane, AAF.
1171508 T. G. Lane, RAFVR.
904263 R. M. Lawrence, RAFVR.
1226295 W. H. Lawrance, RAFVR.
1495752 T. Laybourne, RAFVR.
921522 V. E. Leakey RAFVR.
1497809 H. Leavesley, RAFVR.
956271 W. H. Lee, RAF Regiment.
1375331 E. A. Leech, RAFVR.
2028888 M. G. Leech, RAFVR.
941927 L. Leeder, RAFVR.
213852 G. W. Leigh.
970641 M. Lerner, RAFVR.
985729 N. Levitt, RAFVR.
940372 E. Lewis, RAFVR.
865129 W. H. Lewis, AAF.
747589 L. R. Liddiard, RAFVR.
1119837 G. W. Liddle, RAFVR.
1307828 A. Light, RAFVR.
1477180 A. Light, RAFVR.
1145970 G. W. Lightfoot, RAFVR.
1221429 J. N. Littlemore, RAFVR.
1298675 H. R. Lloyd, RAFVR.
1654187 W. Locke, RAFVR.
613132 H. Lockwood.
1107422 C. Longbottom, RAFVR.
1086436 J. Longmire, RAFVR.
1191573 A. W. Loosemore, RAFVR.
1155260 J. H. K. Lord, RAFVR.
1083853 N. C. Louch, RAFVR.
987168 J. F. Lowe, RAFVR.
1612744 P. G. Lungley, RAFVR.
1176036 F. W. J. Lycett, RAFVR.
1023366 G. McAdam, RAFVR.
998124 D. D. McAllister, RAFVR.
940790 J. L. McCulloch, RAFVR.
1558132 M. McElvogue, RAFVR.
1123196 P. McGregor, RAFVR.
966504 D. McKay, RAFVR.
990459 R. H. McKee, RAFVR.
1123454 J. McKay, RAFVR.
1037793 T. A. McKeag, RAFVR.
1004583 A. Y. McKinnon, RAFVR.
1365028 M. McLean, RAFVR.
993983 N. McLeod, RAFVR.
1100375 J. MacPherson, RAFVR.
1215028 J. L. R. Mack, RAFVR.
1375307 H. W. Malpas, RAFVR.
1197141 C. Mandry, RAFVR.
915661 T. J. J. Mansell, RAFVR.
1063763 H. Markham, RAFVR.
905782 H. W. Marnham, RAFVR.
905737 E. F. Marsh, RAFVR.
934657 G. E. Marsh, RAFVR.
1120240 D. Marshall, RAFVR.
15425 F. L. Marshall.
1165534 G. E. Martin, RAFVR.
1295632 F. Mason.
933570 F. L. Masters, RAFVR.
974297 L. E. Mather, RAFVR.
771039 D. L. Matthews, RAFVR.
1481516 T. J. May, RAFVR.
1304795 E. Mears, RAFVR.
1660402 A. Mellor, RAFVR.
449222 G. A. Mends.
1054586 F. C. Mercer, RAFVR.
1198353 L. Mercer, RAFVR.
624475 M. Millar.
752606 R. F. L. Millen, RAFVR.
938652 R. A. Miller, RAFVR.
1505189 J. Mills, RAFVR.
1170677 L. H. D. Mills, RAFVR.
1204171 A. J. Milnes, RAFVR.
1501368 F. Mitchell, RAFVR.
757256 G. R. Mitchell, RAFVR.
928674 J. Mitchell, RAFVR.
1531301 J. N. Mitchell, RAFVR.
1195091 N. J. Mitchell, RAFVR.
1551933 S. Mitchell, RAFVR.
1467860 R. A. Mitson, RAFVR.
1262381 G. B. Moore, RAFVR.
1060441 S. Moore, RAFVR.
1255541 J. J. Morgan, RAFVR.
1064104 G. Morley, RAFVR.
1304570 O. F. Morris, RAFVR.
1351061 S. D. F. Morris, RAFVR.
1631594 A. E. Moseley, RAFVR.
747339 V. Mould, RAFVR.
1201025 R. W. Moulton, RAFVR.
634991 A. W. H. Moxon.
1133796 H. E. Moxon, RAFVR.
1618473 R. H. Muller, RAFVR.
1055287 J. Murray, RAFVR.
614469 W. H. Myers.
1640864 C. G. Nancarrow, RAFVR.
1379097 F. N. Neale, RAFVR.
1423683 G. P. Neilson, RAFVR.
1190178 B. R. Nelson, RAFVR.
526173 F. Newton.
1046199 J. R. Nicholson, RAFVR.
1223240 H. W. Nixon, RAFVR.
1060872 E. Norton, RAFVR.
1115536 J. E. Oakes, RAFVR.
752256 W. H. Oakley, RAFVR.
1100516 W. J. O'Connell, RAFVR.
1058132 F. Oddy, RAFVR.
1085315 J. R. Ody, RAFVR.
1463283 P. F. W. Offard, RAFVR.
1002164 J. O'Hara, RAFVR.
911432 F. J. Ohlson, RAFVR.
1527130 J. E. Oliver, RAFVR.
845502 H. W. Orchard, AAF.
924026 C. H. Ottewill, RAFVR.
1124171 R. W. Owen, RAFVR.
1095278 P. W. Padley, RAFVR.
975439 D. E. Page, RAFVR.
934612 S. Page, RAFVR.
1208180 W. J. Page, RAFVR.
1132739 H. Parkinson, RAFVR.
1140051 R. Parry, RAFVR.
1155882 C. J. W. Parsons, RAFVR.
485267 I. V. Passey.
1639186 J. O. V, Patmore, RAFVR.
1021786 J. Patrick, RAFVR.
1001737 W. A. Pawson, RAFVR.
1166833 L. C. A. Pearce, RAFVR.
1130528 D. H. H. S. Pears, RAFVR.
954401 T. A. Peat, RAFVR.
1054223 A. B. Pennington, RAFVR.
1493198 R. E. Pennington, RAFVR.
1450532 W. Perez, RAFVR.
1151728 P. J. Perkins, RAFVR.
356866 H. Perry.
1542580 J. Perry, RAFVR.
1263218 C. J. Pettit, RAFVR.
1465518 H. I. Petty, RAFVR.
520919 R. W. Philipson.
916311 J. A. Phillips, RAFVR.
1172514 A. L. Pickering, RAFVR.
546353 E. C. Pickett.
1018682 G. Pickett, RAFVR.
1154034 T. J. Pomfret, RAFVR.
551555 T. J. Pool.
1468345 E. Pooley, RAFVR.
1285387 J. S. Potter, RAFVR.
1161428 I. J. Powell, RAFVR.
1162650 F. J. J. Pressley, RAFVR.
1197763 T. Priddle, RAFVR.
971442 K. L. Pridmore, RAFVR.
955414 L. A. Proud, RAFVR.
1017605 C. Pryce, RAFVR.
1536379 P. Quinn, RAFVR.
536976 E. Quirie.
1084120 R. G. Ragless, RAFVR.
1445196 B. E. Ramsden, RAFVR.
1041844 W. Randall, RAFVR.
1234628 R. A. Ranns, RAFVR.
1635907 A. Rathbone, RAFVR.
1065790 S. Rawlings, RAFVR.
1710375 A. S. Reaney, RAFVR.
1455928 J. O. Redman, RAFVR.
929581 T. J. Redwood, RAFVR.
1536489 N. C. Reeves, RAFVR.
844351 V. E. Reeves, AAF.
1031870 H. Rennison, RAFVR.
966845 H. C. Renwick, RAFVR.
1562829 H. D. Riach, RAFVR.
1186750 N. Richards, RAFVR.
990425 J. D. Richardson, RAFVR.
995785 J. M. Richardson, RAFVR.
637817 T. W. G. Richardson.
1188207 H. A. Ridgeway, RAFVR.
1000153 C. L. Rigby, RAFVR.
1050450 A. Riley, RAFVR.
1083731 T. Riley, RAFVR.
1460526 T. L. Rimell, RAFVR.
997136 F. R. Rimes, RAFVR.
1056370 R. Ripley, RAFVR.
1004009 A. J. Ritch, RAFVR.
1287666 J. W. P. Roberts, RAFVR.
982358 H. C. Roberts, RAFVR.
977243 J. H. Roberts, RAFVR.
524378 J. Robertson.
944375 E. A. Robins, RAFVR.
943689 F. H. Robinson, RAFVR.
1494346 G.S. Robinson, RAFVR.
1101338 H. L. Robinson, RAFVR.
983140 J. L. Robinson, RAFVR.
1030049 J. Rodgers, RAFVR.
1048029 B. L. Rogers, RAFVR.
612424 D. J. Rogers.
905023 J. L. Rogers, RAFVR.
756771 A. Rqome, RAFVR.
1646387 D. F. H. Ross, RAFVR.
1427700 C. R. H. Rowe, RAFVR.
1222026 W. J. Rowe, RAFVR.
591969 W. E. Rowland.
1309709 R. K. Roylance, RAFVR.
1446724 E. V. Rudd, RAFVR.
1348806 A. M. Runcie, RAFVR.
1428147 R. G. C. Russell, RAFVR.
1224145 H. J. Sage, RAFVR.
1274117 R. J. Salway, RAFVR.
1531339 F. Sandeford, RAFVR.
1366620 S. L. E. Sangwine, RAFVR.
1299637 W. S. Sarah, RAFVR.
1190030 A. G. W. Saunders, RAFVR.
1092815 H. V. Sawyer, RAFVR.
1396749 R. J. C. Sawyer, RAFVR.
915047 L. A. Scheurer, RAFVR.
1145425 S. J. Schofield, RAFVR.
1463775 G. Scott, RAFVR.
1008301 J. Scott, RAFVR.
644501 V. C. G. Scott.
1149663 E. Seddon, RAFVR.
1512989 G. E. Seedhouse, RAFVR.
775575 K. Semenowsky, RAFVR.
1453542 H. A. Sessions, RAFVR.
1248874 S. W. Sewell, RAFVR.
1586362 A. S. Seymour, RAFVR.
1168817 N. L. Shapley, RAFVR.
1208408 H. R. Sharpe, RAFVR.
1016278 T. Sharrock, RAFVR.
977398 J. Shaw, RAFVR.
1418723 F. G. Sheppard, RAFVR.
885017 J. Sherman, AAF.
1171542 R. J. Sherwood, RAFVR.
1144022 J. Shipley, RAFVR.
1047598 T. H. N. Shipp, RAFVR.
1512736 R. Sidebotham, RAFVR.
1413595 F. W. Silk, RAFVR.
1674742 A. D. Simmonds, RAFVR.
1079773 F. C. Simmonds, RAFVR.
1282177 S. G. Simmons, RAFVR.
747024 E. G. Simpson, RAFVR.
1047562 R. Simpson, RAFVR.
1186894 R. H. Sims, RAFVR.
1368273 J. T. Sinclair, RAFVR.
1004295 G. Skelland, RAFVR.
1092403 C. J. Skipper, RAFVR.
998534 V. Slater, RAFVR.
1008410 B. K. Smalley, RAFVR.
1163613 A. Smith, RAFVR.
807205 A. Smith, AAF.
1063078 A. Smith, RAFVR.
1484461 C. Smith, RAFVR.
1014882 F. C. Smith, RAFVR.
976808 E. Y. Smith, RAFVR.
925790 H. E. Smith, RAFVR.
908102 R. A. F. Smith, RAFVR.
539349 T. Smith.
1052959 T. A. Smith, RAFVR.
1012464 W. Smith, RAFVR.
987773 N. Smurden, RAFVR.
702463 R. F. Smurden, RAFVR.
629965 J. H. H. Snowden.
1201115 E. R. Speake, RAFVR.
815199 B. Spencer, AAF.
1086389 W. G. Spencer, RAFVR.
1237939 H. W. J. Spittle, RAFVR.
1143420 T. Sproats, RAFVR.
1114626 G. Stafford, RAFVR.
1489104 J. Stansfield, RAFVR.
1530837 E. Statter, RAFVR.
1795698 G. Steedman, RAFVR.
950817 H. Stephenson, RAFVR.
1103614 H. M. Stevens, RAFVR.
982364 K. E. Stevenson, RAFVR.
1195016 M. C. Stirk, RAFVR.
1029358 E. Stock, RAFVR.
1523356 F. T. Stocker, RAFVR.
994007 T. M. Stocksley, RAFVR.
1617823 R. A. Stockwell, RAFVR.
1160221 W. G. Stokes, RAFVR.
1096077 J. G. Stonehouse, RAFVR.
949056 T. F. Stonton, RAFVR.
1370554 J. W. L. Stopani, RAFVR.
1462618 R. C. T. Strange, RAFVR.
1442608 J. Strong, RAFVR.
253329 R. J. Strudwick, RAFVR.
1501871 J. E. Styche, RAFVR.
1462892 V. J. Stygall, RAFVR.
1131316 P. G. Sudbury, RAFVR.
1497535 E. Suggitt, RAFVR.
1194287 L. Sutcliffe, RAFVR.
1158038 R. L. Swann, RAFVR.
1216677 R. N. Swinchatt, RAFVR.
1143241 N. B. Sykes, RAFVR.
1027542 N. Symm, RAFVR.
1223377 A. A. Taylor, RAFVR.
1467331 E. Taylor, RAFVR.
1429703 H. S. Taylor, RAFVR.
1204662 L. Taylor, RAFVR.
1143459, L. Taylor, RAFVR.
750702 G. R. Teagoe, RAFVR.
1203956 S. T. Tegg, RAFVR.
1100627 A. J. Tetlow, RAFVR.
1361481 A. Y. Thom, RAFVR.
1067901 B. H. Thomas, RAFVR.
1019455 D. Thomas, RAFVR.
1404457 I. J. Thomas, RAFVR.
614697 M. J. Thomas.
1296835 W. H. Thomas, RAFVR.
592054 E. Thompson.
999048 J. L. Thompson, RAFVR.
1085038 V. M. Thompson, RAFVR.
1167279 G. W. Thomson, RAFVR.
1123095 J. W. Thomson, RAFVR.
1262550 R. Thorne, RAFVR.
1508379 F. W. Thornton, RAFVR.
1692591 L. R. Thornton, RAFVR.
813228 I. R. Tillett, RAFVR.
1115936 G. Timson, RAFVR.
1073991 L.Tingay, RAFVR.
1030169 E. Titman, RAFVR.
2061560 O. M. Tomalin, RAFVR.
1100441 D. Tolmie, RAFVR.
1224754 E. G. Torpey, RAFVR.
1057398 W. Tranter, RAFVR.
1611800 C. Tree, RAFVR.
1121199 H. Turner, RAFVR.
901366 K. R. Tyndall, RAFVR.
870975 G. Usher, RAFVR.
1159346 F. W. Utteridge, RAFVR.
1033910 R. Utting, RAFVR.
1018878 E. Vaughan, RAFVR.
1676707 W. Vaughan, RAFVR.
1194957 K. J. Verney, RAFVR.
1185257 D. B. Vicars, RAFVR.
1138769 J. Vose, RAFVR.
1719982 F. V. Wagner, RAFVR.
1441257 D. F. Walker, RAFVR.
931180 H. L. Walker, RAFVR.
1207264 I. V. Walker, RAFVR.
1465370 J. A. H. Walker, RAFVR.
748489 T. M. Walker, RAFVR.
1374548 J. Wallace, RAFVR.
1225344 A. G. Waller, RAFVR.
892733 R. K. Wallis.
1302480 J. R. Walls, RAFVR.
1475716 E. D. Walmsley, RAFVR.
1086872 G. A. Weatherell, RAFVR.
925769 C. B. Webb, RAFVR.
952484 G. G. Webster, RAFVR.
1357680 R. Webster, RAFVR.
1189873 N. J. Weekes, RAFVR.
1077814 R. Welch, RAFVR.
1377635 T. B. Welford, RAFVR.
536222 W. W. H. Wellcome.
1378521 R. L. Wells, RAFVR.
750761 C. J. F. Whaley, RAFVR.
1152090 C. W. Wheeler, RAFVR.
1175466 J. Whitaker, RAFVR.
1165752 A. E. G. White, RAFVR.
462609 M. White.
1645390 R. White, RAFVR.
1117906 W. Whitehead, RAFVR.
1506428 A. F. Whitfield, RAFVR.
1150626 F. S. Whittle, RAFVR.
1220700 W. Whorwood, RAFVR.
940570 A. E. Wilday, RAFVR.
1156022 R. J. Wilde, RAFVR.
1357028 E. W. Wilkinson, RAFVR.
1051153 F. Wilkinson, RAFVR.
981855 T. W. Wilkinson, RAFVR.
1001227 K. Willacy, RAFVR.
1489904 W. Willan, RAFVR.
1067569 A. H. L. Williams, RAFVR.
1508295 C. Williams, RAFVR.
1204198 E. Williams, RAFVR.
1576221 G. Williams, RAFVR.
939379 H. A. Williams, RAFVR.
1267518 H. L. Williams, RAFVR.
1402562 I. Williams, RAFVR.
1655653 J, A. Williams, RAFVR.
1169596 L. W. Williams, RAFVR.
980918 S. B. H. Williams, RAFVR.
1102461 W. Williams, RAFVR.
1266540 H. A. Willis, RAFVR.
1039451 A. A. Wilson, RAFVR.
1127833 J. Wilson, RAFVR.
939577 M. Wilson, RAFVR.
808377 M. Wilson, AAF.
743424 W. Wilson, RAFVR.
1124959 W. Wilson, RAFVR.
917663 W. Wilson, RAFVR.
1009995 W. J. Wilson, RAFVR.
1427236 W. Wingfield, RAFVR.
1502048 A. Winnett, RAFVR.
1485093 W. Wolfenden, RAFVR.
756791 K. D. Wolsey, RAFVR.
1041144 M. Wood, RAFVR.
1129262 B. Woodbridge, RAFVR.
971836 C. S. Woodcock, RAFVR.
643774 T. Wormald.
1105275 F. C. Wright, RAFVR.
1116825 T. R. Yallop, RAFVR.
973656 W. S. Young, RAFVR.
1250286 G. A. Youngs, RAFVR.

 Acting Corporals

1004086 I. Bielby, RAFVR.
1377894 L. C. Byles, RAFVR.
1429168 E. L. Dallman, RAFVR.
1158013 H. L. Fisher, RAFVR.
1619097 C. Hurcum, RAFVR.
1378342 S. C. Jerrard, RAFVR.
1176186 S. Johnson, RAFVR.
1496863 A. C. Money, RAFVR.
1408325 I. J. Owen, RAFVR.
1090236 R. J. Pratt, RAFVR.
1040799 J. W. Robinson, RAFVR.
1123796 J. Slee, RAFVR.
1564105 L. A. Wade, RAFVR.

 Leading Aircraftmen

1297881 A. Allen, RAFVR.
1225829 F. H. Allen, RAFVR.
1682726 G. E. Ambrose, RAFVR.
986720 R. Anderson, RAFVR.
1435335 H. S. Andrews, RAFVR.
992236 A. L. Appleby, RAFVR.
1008866 F. Ashworth, RAFVR.
1852822 C. F. M. Attiwell, RAFVR.
J 504390 K. Avison, RAFVR.
1631321 G. E. Aylett, RAFVR.
1171543 A. R. C. Baker, RAFVR.
1027371 G. E. Baker, RAFVR.
1412706 S. Baker, RAFVR.
1010274 H. Ball, RAFVR.
1677013 R. Ball, RAFVR.
1148094 W. J. Balmer, RAFVR.
1621990 G. Barlow, RAFVR.
1663295 L. R. Barlow, RAFVR.
1012076 C. E. Barnes, RAFVR.
1308826 C. H. Barrett, RAFVR.
1143615 J. Bartlett, RAFVR.
975937 A. E. Baxendale, RAFVR.
921927 J. Beare, RAFVR.
1529552 F. Beaumont, RAFVR.
1498265 W. F. Bedell, RAFVR.
1161271 H. W. Bedwell, RAFVR.
857562 H. G. Belch, AAF.
1696416 W. D. Bellamy, RAFVR.
1644092 A. W. Benee, RAFVR.
1696606 J. Bennett, RAFVR.
1137620 L. V. Bennett, RAFVR.
1492714 T. Benson, RAFVR.
927446 E. T. Betts, RAFVR.
1427186 G. D. Bicknell, RAFVR.
1320138 V. E. Birch, RAFVR.
1155198 R. Birchall, RAFVR.
1560068 G. Bishop, RAF Regiment.
1099710 H. W. Bishop, RAFVR.
1397473 I H. A. Blowers, RAFVR.
393132 S. Blundell, RAFVR.
1414019 J. W. N. Blythe, RAFVR.
926715 C. C. Bone, RAFVR.
1295804 L. G. Booler, RAFVR.
1308991 R. H. F. Bouch, RAFVR.
1491039 W. F. Boulton, RAFVR.
1014626 E. R. Bowker, RAFVR.
1777575 R. F. Bowles, RAFVR.
1240229 P. W. Box, RAFVR.
1042716 J. Bradley, RAFVR.
1520726 K. Bradley, RAFVR.
1092484 R. H. Breeze, RAFVR.
1056678 N. Brittain, RAFVR.
920197 J. N. Brower, RAFVR.
1308191 F. Brown, RAFVR.
1785273 T. B. Brown. RAFVR.
1378461 W. R. Brown, RAFVR.
642331 C. C. Buckley.
1878709 E. J. Bunn, RAFVR.
1186804 W. G. Burch, RAFVR.
980666 A. T. H. Burgess, RAFVR.
846247 W. A. Burgess, AAF.
1184074 A. E. Burns, RAFVR.
1344276 W. Butters, RAFVR.
1325735 J. E. Butterworth, RAFVR.
1485973 C. Bycroft, RAFVR.
1370797 J. Byers, RAFVR.
1464732 C. E. Byrne, RAFVR.
1495101 W. H. Cain, RAFVR.
1663788 A. J. Carey, RAFVR.
1275929 J. Carpenter, RAFVR.
1648065 J. W. Carter, RAFVR.
1047821 T. H. Cave, RAFVR.
1830157 J. H. Cawsey, RAFVR.
1348758 W. Chaffe, RAFVR.
1423322 E. Chapman, RAFVR.
1308571 E. G. Chilton, RAFVR.
1386683 S. G. Chinery, RAFVR.
1650230 F. W. Chinnery, RAFVR.
1869059 W. A. Chittenden, RAFVR.
1436701 G. C. Chivers, RAFVR.
1019398 S. McA. Christie, RAFVR.
1240078 P. J. T. Church, RAFVR.
1423418 W. J. T. Church, RAFVR.
1041513 G. E. Clague, RAFVR.
2201193 J. A. Clague, RAFVR.
1158885 A. E. Cleverly, RAFVR.
1308627 A. H. Clode, RAFVR.
1226338 F. P. Clokkou, RAFVR.
1190471 P. J. Clough, RAFVR.
1200428 W. W. Coburn, RAFVR.
1071742 J. H. Cockburn, RAFVR.
1215179 E. C. Coleman, RAFVR.
1662510 K. H. Coleman, RAFVR.
1172921 N. H. Coleman, RAFVR.
1643136 J. H. Haskin-Coles, RAFVR.
1294671 E. J. A. Collett, RAFVR.
907771 F. A. Collins, RAFVR.
863543 J. J. G. A. Compton, AAF.
523257 J. F. Cook, RAFVR.
1469133 G. A. Cooke, RAFVR.
1377144 R. Cooke, RAFVR.
3011756 H. Cooper, RAFVR.
1088777 P. H. Cooper, RAFVR.
1247572 P. J. W. Cooper, RAFVR.
1056022 F. J. Cothan, RAFVR.
1121444 H. Couzens, RAFVR.
1408263 G. H. P. Cox, RAFVR.
1096236 J. Cox, RAFVR.
1381422 K. E. Cox, RAFVR.
1474061 W. C. Cox, RAFVR.
17111773 G. E. Cradock, RAFVR.
1064566 E. Craig, RAFVR.
1237299 H. J. A. Crisp, RAFVR.
1180615 B. C. Cross, RAFVR.
1470637 R. W. M. Cross, RAFVR.
1514038 J. S. Cunningham, RAFVR.
1461292 E. N. Dand, RAFVR.
1644927 D. E. Daniels, RAFVR.
1669583 B. F. Darby, RAFVR.
1692249 E. Darling, RAFVR.
1240091 E. W. J. Darlow, RAFVR.
536724 D. G. Davies.
1438351 H. Davies, RAFVR.
1352375 N. W. Davies, RAFVR.
1358888 R. W. J. Davies, RAFVR.
1067045 T. Davies, RAFVR.
1450952 R. C. Davis, RAFVR.
1497190 W. Davis, RAFVR.
978197 W. G. Davis, RAFVR.
1477701 D. B. Dawson, RAFVR.
1575440 F. Dawson, RAFVR.
1632414 L. R. Deakin, RAFVR.
1650227 G. C. Deane, RAFVR.
1673983 A. Dearden, RAFVR.
1717567 L. Dennis, RAFVR.
1620993 R. V. Desombre, RAFVR.
1092430 R. Devine, RAFVR.
1420287 E. N. Diels, RAFVR.
1246739 J. Diggens, RAFVR.
1135927 A. Kirkin, RAFVR.
1201956 C. F. Dolton, RAFVR.
1540138 S. Douglas, RAFVR.
1468555 J. V. C. Doyle, RAFVR.
1874297 E. E. G. Duck, RAFVR.
1657177 S. C. A. Dudley, RAFVR.
1689732 D. C. Duncan, RAFVR.
1065180 B. P. Dunne, RAFVR.
1671780 D. Eagle, RAFVR.
1550424 F. Edington, RAFVR.
1659192 C. Edwards, RAFVR.
1666805 C. G. Edwards, RAFVR.
1236760 J. A. Ellwood, RAFVR.
744203 W. G. Ellis, RAFVR.
1309194 A. S. England, RAFVR.
1468750 G. England, RAFVR.
051307 D. G. Evans, RAFVR.
1166837 R. J. Evans, RAFVR.
1870381 G. E. S. Everill, RAFVR.
1645886 F. A. Ewin, RAFVR.
1340475 W. G. Fanning, RAFVR.
1645933 R. H. Farley, RAFVR.
961175 W. D. Feasey, RAFVR.
1516192 H. Feather, RAFVR.
1096583 P. H. Felton, RAFVR.
1455578 F. H. Fenn, RAFVR.
1555153 G. M. Ferguson, RAFVR.
1246271 E. R. Few, RAFVR.
1429288 S. C. Field, RAFVR.
996050 H. E. Finch, RAFVR.
1617766 C. R. G. Finnis, RAFVR.
1066973 G. J. Fisher, RAFVR.
1012783 S. Fletcher, RAFVR.
1031132 A. Flood, RAFVR.
1726863 E. Flynn, RAFVR.
1127282 E. Ford, RAFVR.
1528531 N. H. Foreman, RAFVR.
1491960 A. Foster, RAFVR.
1547876 G. G. Fowler, RAFVR.
1619600 J. Fowler, RAFVR.
1068088 H. Fox, RAFVR.
1528730 J. Fox, RAFVR.
1417477 C. Francis, RAFVR.
1058554 K. G. Galloway, RAFVR.
1356995 J. Ganley, RAFVR.
1680473 F. Garlick, RAFVR.
1532129 J. E. Gaynor, RAFVR.
1447721 W. W. George, RAFVR.
1310313 A. J. Gilbert, RAFVR.
1178528 H. S. Gilderthorpe, RAFVR.
1070277 A. R. Gill, RAFVR.
635002 W. F. Godfrey.
1194313 C. L. Goff, RAFVR.
1640028 J. T. Gooch, RAFVR.
947901 A. Gordon, RAFVR.
1025710 J. Gordon, RAFVR.
1711705 J. Gower, RAFVR.
1079527 R. E. Cowing, RAFVR.
1561958 P. Graham, RAFVR.
1008344 R. Grantham, RAFVR.
1485050 N. A. Graves, RAFVR.
1698656 H. Green, RAFVR.
967588 L. M. Gregory, RAFVR.
1542663 W. R. Gregory, RAFVR.
1285647 H. D. Grimmer, RAFVR.
1088464 C. F. E. Grinham, RAFVR.
2208411 H. V. Groom, RAFVR.
1311734 J. O. Groves, RAFVR.
1510666 R. Grubb, RAFVR.
1830813 R. D. Guthrie, RAFVR.
1641960 W. N. Hackney, RAFVR.
1501278 S. Hadfield, RAFVR.
1139140 H. Haines, RAFVR.
964762 F. J. Hales, RAFVR.
1585844 K. G. Halfhide, RAFVR.
1371236 J. Hall, RAFVR.
1548906 J. W. Hall, RAFVR.
2202938 G. Hammond, RAFVR.
359772 A. Harbottle.
1660589 W. H. Harden, RAFVR.
2215248 J. Hardman, RAFVR.
1697167 C. P. Hare, RAFVR.
1487185 A. L. Hargreaves, RAFVR.
1035593 W. Hargreaves, RAFVR.
1666310 E. G. Harris, RAFVR.
1667911 F. H. Harris, RAFVR.
1158858 P. C. Harris, RAFVR.
1078386 C. H. A. Harrison, RAFVR.
1644388 F, Hart, RAFVR.
964869 G. Hartshorn, RAFVR.
996680 F. Hawcroft, RAFVR.
1280599 E. G. Hayes, RAFVR.
1870252 E. Healey, RAFVR.
1139701 R. W. Heppenstall, RAFVR.
998574 F. Hewitt, RAFVR.
1236022 E. J. Heywood, RAFVR.
1396388 R. D. Hillyer, RAFVR.
1466779 W. G. Hinton, RAFVR.
1171324 W. M. Hodge, RAFVR.
1078659 K. Hodgson, RAFVR.
993359 J. N. McP. Hogg, RAF Regiment.
952510 F. L. Holden, RAFVR.
1158446 J. E. Holdsworth, RAFVR.
1506596 H. Holford, RAFVR.
1084683 J. Hope, RAFVR.
849206 W. S. A. Horobin, AAF.
1872684 A. E. Houghton, RAFVR.
1079165 L. S. Howard, RAFVR.
810193 J. Howell, AAF.
1640223 D. C. Hudson, RAFVR.
1208865 W. Hudson, RAFVR.
1796137 M. J. Hughes, RAFVR.
1771172 L. Hurford, RAFVR.
1527379 W. Hurst, RAFVR.
1345327 P. Husband, RAFVR.
1342813 A. Hutchinson, RAFVR.
1067632 A. Hutton, RAFVR.
981393 W. B. Hynd, RAFVR.
646361 R. Irving.
1421302 C. F. Jackson, RAFVR.
633616 N. James.
1092662 S. James, RAFVR.
1068698 I. W. L. Jefferson, RAFVR.
455091 C. L. Jenden, RAFVR.
1011423 K. W. Jenkins, RAFVR.
1487214 G. A. Jensen, RAFVR.
1115069 F. Johnson, RAFVR.
1410381 H. W. Johnson, RAFVR.
1408692 P. J. Johnson, RAFVR.
1230740 A. Jones, RAFVR.
1200363 D. H. T. Jones, RAFVR.
1304823 E. A. Jones, RAFVR.
1657408 H. L. Jones, RAFVR.
1189218 L. Jones, RAFVR.
1300544 T. A. H. Jones, RAFVR.
775822 S. H. Kassis, RAFVR.
746411 G. F. Keating, RAFVR.
1410299 J. Keegan, RAFVR.
1555180 A. Keegans, RAFVR.
1202057 L. G. Kerry, RAFVR.
1149177 J. Kidd, RAFVR.
1560842 H. C. King, RAFVR.
1154808 W. King, RAFVR.
1660426 H. Kirby, RAFVR.
980682 W. H. Kirby, RAFVR.
1008803 C. Kondrat, RAFVR.
1039794 R. C. Lamb, RAFVR.
1189336 J. B. Langham, RAFVR.
1137895 T. L. Lashbrook, RAFVR.
1055867 J. W. Laycock, RAFVR.
1465896 A. C. Leah, RAFVR.
1242058 L. A. Leakey, RAFVR.
1070476 G. Legge, RAFVR.
1250833 L. L. Legon, RAFVR.
1091807 J. Leonard, RAFVR.
648387 C. F. Lewis.
1501244 E. G. Lewis, RAFVR.
1631683 P. J. Lewis, RAFVR.
1463247 G. E. Lidlow, RAFVR.
1378015 E. W. Long, RAFVR.
1179112 A. Lowe, RAFVR.
1227834 G. W. Luffman, RAFVR.
1533019 L. G. Lush, RAFVR.
1370088 F. McAleese, RAFVR.
1513121 E. McCartney, RAFVR.
1385215 D. J. McGeary, RAFVR.
1371980 J. McGhee, RAFVR.
1499005 J. L. McGrath, RAFVR.
980611 J. Mackay, RAFVR.
2207668 G. Mackenzie, RAFVR.
1093618 J. F. McKevitt, RAFVR.
1571650 A. R. Macmillan, RAFVR.
1274013 J. H. G. McMillan, RAFVR.
1346755 R. MacSwan, RAFVR.
1667536 D. H. Maloney, RAFVR.
1189268 G. H. Mann, RAFVR.
1647277 A. C. Mansell, RAFVR.
1367232 I A. Marshall, RAFVR.
293535 A. C. Martin, RAFVR.
1249511 H. Martin, RAFVR.
1345337 A. Mathieson, RAFVR.
1337636 D. A. E. Mauser, RAFVR.
1637972 A. C. Mead, RAFVR.
1105971 M. Mead, RAFVR.
1170065 F. H. Meaddows, RAFVR.
643260 D. W. Meaton.
1286089 D. W. Medgett, RAFVR.
647172 I F. Medhurst.
571938 G. D. Meldrum, RAFVR.
1289439 C. H. Melhuish, RAFVR.
1303841 C. Mercer, RAFVR.
1242006 E. W. Middleton, RAFVR.
1694528 W. Middleton, RAFVR.
1445451 T. D. Miles, RAFVR.
1201058 G. E. Milgate, RAFVR.
1683747 D. Moore, RAFVR.
15636711 L. E. Moore, RAFVR.
1537540 F. W. Moores, RAFVR.
744210 C. J. Moorhouse, RAFVR.
1111240 T. Morgan, RAFVR.
1660599 V. A. H. Moring, RAFVR.
1656567 E. Morris, RAFVR.
1051725 H. Morrison, RAFVR.
1299623 E. F. Morton, RAFVR.
1643514 J. H. Morton, RAFVR.
574585 J. L. Moyle.
1225146 M. J. Murray, RAFVR.
1214812 K. A. Neale, RAFVR.
1651649 F. J. Newman, RAFVR.
1255140 D. R. Nicholas, RAFVR.
1141032 J. V. Nichols, RAFVR.
1042774 E. Nightingale, RAFVR.
1902990 J. P. Nixon, RAFVR.
1611671 E. H. Nokes, RAFVR.
1271180 B. J. Orman, RAFVR.
1489625 T. L. Nuttall, RAFVR.
1074640 M. J. O'Brien, RAFVR.
1613042 W. C. Ogden, RAFVR.
1668616 C. G. Osmond, RAFVR.
1523604 R. W. Owen, RAFVR.
1430953 L. W. Packham, RAFVR.
1449587 W. A. F. Page, RAFVR.
1481739 A. Palmer, RAFVR.
1516099 A. Parker, RAFVR.
1471479 B. J. Parsons, RAFVR.
1070585 R. A. Pashley, RAFVR.
1517983 F. Patrick, RAFVR.
1435627 R. W. Payne, RAFVR.
1166982 F. Peacock, RAFVR.
1149316 F. Pead, RAFVR.
1450738 C. J. E. Pearce, RAFVR.
626455 K. T. P. Pearce.
645177 F. Pearson.
1197125 J. W. Peck, RAFVR.
1114437 H. Perrin, RAFVR.
1458493 S. W. Perrin, RAFVR.
1482137 T. J. Perry, RAFVR.
1514799 G. Peters, RAFVR.
1365152 R. Petrie, RAFVR.
1189619 N. O. Philpot, RAFVR.
1526804 L. Pickup, RAFVR.
1220840 G. H. Piears, RAFVR.
911884 H. M. Pinnock, RAFVR.
1024657 L. A. C. Plumb, RAFVR.
1542977 G. E. Pollard, RAFVR.
1237609 N. D. Poole, RAFVR.
1214304 E. S. Powell, RAFVR.
1008973 H. Pratt, RAFVR.
1710352 H. T. Prestwich, RAFVR.
1649797 F. Priestley, RAFVR.
577814 D. H. Pring.
1421563 G. C. Pryor, RAFVR.
1040158 F. W. Pullan, RAFVR.
1106749 J. Pullar, RAFVR.
1154206 J. A. Pullen, RAFVR.
1433308 T. H. Quantrill, RAFVR.
1263355 L. Quick, RAFVR.
981003 G. C. Raeside, RAFVR.
1385310 H. Ragan, RAFVR.
991456 S. J. Raisey, RAFVR.
1616680 A. R. Read, RAFVR.
1463306 J. R. Read, RAFVR.
841177 W. F. J. Reed, RAFVR.
1366815 R. P. Reid, RAFVR.
1326164 G. K. Revill, RAFVR.
1050696 H. Reynolds, RAFVR.
1181794 J. S. Reynolds, RAFVR.
1419979 P. E. Richards, RAFVR.
1547993 E. V. Riches, RAFVR.
1334256 C. H. G. Ridgers, RAFVR.
533757 F. Rimmer.
1687595 F. O. Roberts, RAFVR.
1128596 N. Robinson, RAFVR.
915673 E. H. Rogers, RAFVR.
1675017 J. Rogers, RAFVR.
354364 G. W. Rose.
1393957 N. C. Rouse, RAFVR.
507313 D. McDermott-Row, RAFVR.
928188 H. F. Rowlands, RAFVR.
1434414 A. F. Rowley, RAFVR.
1091651 L. Rushworth, RAFVR.
1641251 H. F. E. Russell, RAFVR.
1667423 J. Russell, RAFVR.
778232 L. J. C. Salter, RAFVR.
1102821 J. Samuel, RAFVR.
1061375 T. D. Scott, RAFVR.
1477303 A. Seaton, RAFVR.
1038468 C. C. Shakespeare, RAFVR.
1526943 C. C. Shasby, RAFVR.
1864477 E. Shaw, RAFVR.
1149397 H. Shaw, RAFVR.
1648302 T. H. Shearer, RAFVR.
1644376 W. E. Sheldon, RAFVR.
1024647 W. Shepherd, RAFVR.
1108028 D. M. Shirlow, RAFVR.
1694311 O. Shufflebottom, RAFVR.
1070935 D. T. Simmons, RAFVR.
1259728 R. Simpson, RAFVR.
1076069 A. J. Sims, RAFVR.
1830266 J. B. Skuse, RAFVR.
1349453 A. Smith, RAFVR.
1100252 C. B. Smith, RAFVR.
1045874 D. Smith, RAFVR.
1547277 E. F. Smith, RAFVR.
1321853 E. G. Smith, RAFVR.
1291933 F. Smith, RAFVR.
1578652 G. Smith, RAFVR.
1236501 L. T. Smith, RAFVR.
1782123 O. Smith, RAFVR.
1614992 W. M. B. Smith, RAFVR.
1201173 C. E. Sorrell, RAFVR.
1643658 R. L. G. Spraggons, RAFVR.
1444337 T. C. Spurgeon, RAFVR.
1638921 E. J. Spurr, RAFVR.
1527205 A. Stancliffe, RAFVR.
611032 H. Standing.
1405270. W. E. Staeleton, RAFVR.
1525295 S. Starling RAFVR.
1017057 H. J. Steege, RAFVR.
989008 F. Steele, RAFVR.
1034589 G. B. Steele, RAFVR.
959127 C. E. Stevens, RAFVR.
1412776 P. Stevens, RAFVR.
1785391 A. H. Stewart, RAFVR.
1502324 J. A. Stoddard, RAFVR.
1248927 C. S. Stokes, RAFVR.
1693560 J. Stuart, RAFVR.
1406707 N. Sutton, RAFVR.
1133589 A. E. Sykes, RAFVR.
1419294 H. F. Symes, RAFVR.
1619563 S. J. Symonds, RAFVR.
1650432 T. H. Tacchi, RAFVR.
1297996 E. J. Taylor, RAFVR.
1870703 W. F. Taylor, RAFVR.
1668751 C. S. Thomas, RAFVR.
1708159 D. A. Thomas, RAFVR.
1663156 C. E. Thompson, RAFVR.
962395 W. J. Thompson, RAFVR.
985861 L. Timlin, RAFVR.
941539 C. Tinker, RAFVR.
1878042 H. Titter, RAFVR.
1083001 H. W. G. Tomlin, RAFVR.
1738643 A. J. Tongue, RAFVR.
908358 A. W. Tooke, RAFVR.
1340879 J. S. Torrie, RAFVR.
1278203 W. C. Tracey, RAFVR.
1172242 C. R. Trevenna, RAFVR.
1376818 G. Tullis, RAFVR.
1377078 T. J. Turner, RAFVR.
1860255 A. J. Turrell, RAFVR.
1109316 F. W. Uttley, RAFVR.
1261164 C. A. Valente, RAFVR.
1693007 A. A. Vanwell, RAFVR.
1284221 H. G. Vickery, RAFVR.
1229703 J. W. Vigus, RAFVR.
1437072 A. J. Vince, RAFVR.
1160515 R. G. Vines, RAFVR.
1085685 E. C. Wabrurton, RAFVR.
1117381 F. N. Wade, RAFVR.
1188812 L. R. Wakeford, RAFVR.
1686505 R. C. Walton, RAFVR.
915207 W. J. Wardle, RAFVR.
1200585 J. C. Ware, RAFVR.
1533153 H. W. L. Warner, RAFVR.
1237035 F. R. Waters, RAFVR.
1116295 L. Watts, RAFVR.
920783 M. C. Weaver, RAFVR.
1659575 G. H. Webb, RAFVR.
1118171 J. Webster, RAFVR.
979160 J. L. Wheeler, RAFVR.
1269317 T. A. Whitaker, RAFVR.
302593 J. Whiston, RAFVR.
1003772 A. White, RAFVR.
1036887 F. W. Whitehead, RAFVR.
1512312 J. Wilkinson, RAFVR.
140030 K. Wilkinson.
1507088 R. A. Wilkinson, RAFVR.
1580665 A. Williams, RAFVR.
1403159 H. Williams, RAFVR.
1659860 J. E. Williams, RAFVR.
1298461 W. Williams, RAFVR.
1133190 R. Williamson, RAFVR.
1130555 D. O. Willis, RAFVR.
1717416 R. R. Willis, RAFVR.
1237621 J. Wilson, RAFVR.
1440674 W. S. Wilson, RAFVR.
1635144 J. F. Winship, RAFVR.
1409436 W. E. J. R. Withers, RAFVR.
1469413 F. J. Wood, RAFVR.
1012853 H. Wood, RAFVR.
941517 R. A. Woolley, RAFVR.
1226755 S. Woolsey, RAFVR.
1655396 C. K. Worrall, RAFVR.
1306817 L. A. Wyncherley, RAFVR.
1264360 A. E. Yaxley, RAFVR.
1439680 W. E. Yems, RAFVR.
1715933 J. R. Young, RAFVR.

 Aircraftmen 1st Class

1142980 P. J. Abel, RAFVR.
3021661 F. Atkinson, RAFVR.
1809573 R. Baxter, RAFVR.
2208481 S. H. Boyd, RAFVR.
1299116 N. A.Bradshaw, RAFVR.
1759208 H. Button, RAFVR.
554937 A. Clark, RAFVR.
1830074 H. R. Dearn, RAFVR.
1523203 A. N. Dodd, RAFVR.
1901174 W. H. Drury, RAFVR.
1647594 G. L. Evans, RAFVR.
1513381 J. Gee, RAFVR.
1224732 L. H. Gleghorn, RAFVR.
1067614 J. Gregory, RAFVR.
1628425 L. A. Hollyman, RAFVR.
1830795 K. H. Jenkins, RAFVR.
852197 N. G. Kimberlin, AAF.
1612719 R. F. Ladbrook, RAFVR.
1506335 J. A. Lemendin, RAFVR.
993433 J. McIntyre, RAFVR.
1893566 G. McNamara, RAFVR.
1540182 R. H. Morris, RAFVR.
1524916 M. Overend, RAFVR.
1851624 D. F. Parslow, RAFVR.
1032813 J. T. Pike, RAFVR.
963591 C. A. Preston, RAFVR.
2201655 A. Render, RAFVR.
1643193 G. T. Riley, RAFVR.
3006221 A. B. Saxby, RAFVR.
1689582 W. R. Shaw, RAFVR.
1873975 L. H. Smith, RAFVR.
1275149 W. A. Smith, RAFVR.
1631948 B. Stimson, RAFVR.

 Aircraftmen 2nd Class
1882681 F. Chapman, RAFVR.
1872697 C. C. Elsom, RAFVR.
1829494 E. C. Garry, RAFVR.
1876560 E. L. Vann, RAFVR.

Princess Mary's Royal Air Force Nursing Service
 Acting Senior Sister
D. G. Masters (5143).

 Sisters
J. E. Daly (5506).
C. C. Hipkin (5653).
R. V. M. Hullis (5276).
S. G. A. Hamilton (5644).

Women's Auxiliary Air Force
 Squadron Officers

K. F. Carr (439).
K. I. Connal (19).
K. C. Hunt (247).
A. E. Knight (100).
D. Langham (314).
M. B. Measures (137).
I. R. Prideaux (921).

 Acting Squadron Officer
J. A. Hill (2434).

 Flight Officers

M. Andrew (4984).
M. T. T. Aytoun (1440).
S. M. J. Bowring (1824).
D. H. Britain (1125).
J. Burrett (2160).
B. W. Smith-Carrington (209).
V. D. Dent (1600).
M. E. De Putron (1257).
F. T. Franklin (463).
E. Z. Gauntlett (2788).
Q. F. Green (2018).
J. W. S. Green (2518).
O. B. Greenslade (2368).
M. M. Hoare (2312).
H. Jamieson (4710).
M. A. Jones (1586).
J. H. Lawrence (6485).
R, M. M. McCutcheon (5442).
L. McEntee (425).
J. D. McKay (377).
K. Martin (3242).
L. G. Moore (5291).
G. M. P. Morgan (351).
J. A. Palmer (1737).
E. M. Pasley (2682).
Dr. P. P. Pigott (4578).
A. Pink (2724).
D. R. Pitts (1900).
M. Crawford-Smith (1099).
M. L. Wareham (1803).
S. Willson (2133).

 Acting Flight Officers

E. L. Barsham (5188).
M. B. Binns (2480).
J. Bradbury (4902).
M. E. Heddle (3892).
F. M. Hopkins (889).
J. Leake (6352).
P. V. Mccabe (2371)
K. Roberts (579).
E. A. Skoulding (2351).

 Section Officers

D. J. Babington (3877).
M. M. Bannister (6939).
M. D. V. Beard (735).
P. M. Bed Worth (4670).
O. Boyd (4899).
D. T. Bridgewater (4303).
M. L. Buchanan (6530).
M. E. Catterall (3439).
M. Chambers (4094).
M. M. Dare (5016).
D. Davidson (5922).
S. V. Dryden (6675).
A. N. Edwards (3579).
J. M. Goldsborough (107).
M. Greenwood (3927).
E. M. Hyde (5875)
D. E. King (6636).
J. W. Lovett (4844).
J. Lowrie (4999).
J. E. Macleod (6420).
E. M. M. Monypenny (3121).
B. K. Moss (6928).
J. Mullen (3034).
P. M. Pigeon (2022).
M. E. Price (2305).
J. Reid (3691).
J. E. M. Reid (7220).
F. Roberts (6942).
M. E. Robinson (5754).
D. M. Romanes (5890).
M. E. Rowbottom (2025).
K. V. Russell (6618).
P. K. Savery (3319).
W. L. H. Shaw (3492).
V. J. M. Shillitoe (6775).
H. M. Shuttleworth (6272).
M. H. Smith (6014).
V. W. Smith (2750).
K. F. Stevenson (925).
E. R. Third (6089).
R. C. Ure (1943).
D. M. Wyllie (6666).

 Warrant Officers
B. V. Collins (890499).
M. L. Grantham (886919).

 Flight Sergeants

420737 F. C. Bailey.
887704 L. B. Bloomer.
886440 A. Brown.
897 I. C. Henderson.
420392 L. M. Kynaston.
882283 O. M. Lean.
882658 F. Macdonald.
891798 A. M. Manton.
888299 J. M. Muir.
883376 A. M. Shaw
893466 E. Stephenson.
892524 E. Udall.

 Sergeants

431411 I. M. Anderson.
890441 S. B. Anderson.
2006581 J. M. Bartholomew.
2005194 J. W. Bennett.
477887 J. E. Billing.
466683 G. M. Birch.
431210 J. Bosschey.
441695 M. W. Bowers.
2020098 E. M. Bringes.
449762 T. E. Brown.
2060338 J. M. Burden.
893125 B. M. Castle.
449863 G. J. Croft.
2049193 G. Crowther.
424331 M. Cullen.
447291 L. W. Davies.
893914 F. M. Dimond.
2070128 E. M. Dinnere.
443076 P. Donaldson.
448744 M. E. Gardner.
442615 K. A. Duncan-Goodman.
886284 M. P. Harraway.
477667 P. W. Haydon.
440889 J. K. Hemstalk.
897496 L. Hunt.
2080442 M. Husband.
420631 M. A. Jackson.
477692 H. James.
446036 D. M. Jenno.
880959 K. Jordan.
420578 E. M. Keith.
445019 B. D. Knowles.
468308 P. A. Lampard.
2019681 J. MacArthur.
454576 D. M. N. Miller.
2022665 L. C. Moon.
891688 C. M. Oldham.
895586 D. Penfold.
477897 S. H. Patriche.
2005293 J. M. Ratcliffe.
50419 K. M. Ridley.
420368 M. Salomon.
454230 E. Shaw.
443336 M. Sim.
447323 K. B. Skelding.
891292 W. A. Stevenson.
2069685 J. E. Tague.
895396 L. M. I. Talbot.
884572 G. V. Tassell.
886310 K. Turner.
421982 E. Wales.
465950 E. Walton.
426203 V. D. A. West.
2088014 E. E. M. Winson.
436577 E. Wright.

 Acting Sergeants
445583 O. L. Dollery.
895775 M. M. Stevens.

 Corporals

2064471 G. R. Alibone.
2089307 E. Allen.
2010682 M. Archer.
445126 J. Arden.
2087851 J. Atherton.
2050558 D. Atkins.
2025806 J. Austin.
472394 M. I. Bailey.
890986 D. Bain.
447368 E. G. Balderstone.
2012106 F. H. Barnes.
2027634 I. M. Barry.
431712 N. Bean.
2007797 D. M. Bedingfield.
456378 E. M. Bell.
461446 J. M. Bignell.
2055795 W. S. Bowers.
891576 I. Bradford.
445177 V. Brookes.
2081195 E. Burrows.
2059524 F. M. Burrows.
2010303 J. Butler.
2014954 E. A. Byford.
428084 E. Clayton.
440108 G. E. M. Cockram.
2005511 P. Cody.
2015606 C. M. Copas.
449737 H. E. Cox.
2007794 J. K. Cracknell.
2050470 N. M. Crowther.
886894 J. Cumberbatch.
454556 G. A. Cumming.
466392 J. P. Davis.
458734 G. K. Dawkins.
2068948 B. J. Dean.
2081059 H. Devlin.
883189 H. C. Dix.
448993 L. A. Donald.
2031487 N. E. A. Downie.
20446111. K. Dryden.
2058041 J. Evans.
441388 V. M. Everest.
2043625 M. H. Froud.
2091098 E. Goodfellow.
2061706 O. M. Gorton.
426034 I. H. Green.
432933 S. B. Grudgings.
422286 I. R. Harbord.
893530 C. I. Harding.
448547 M. E. Hartley.
2040137 J. R. S. Hawkins.
446101 E. J. Hodgkinson.
2026843 M. E. Hopkins.
2057306 S. L. Hopkinson.
2026066 A. Hughes.
2032293 G. N. Hurlin.
446920 M. D. James.
421643 F. Johnston.
432325 R. A. Jones.
427642 L. Kay.
2064167 M. McL. Kay.
424737 M. W. Keith.
896216 D. R. King.
897117 E. M. Lamden.
2086473 J. E. Lewis.
462298 A. M. Liddell.
2004312 A. J. Little.
462227 E. W. Livemore.
455725 P. E. Lucken.
2016300 L. M. McCabe.
2136405 J. Marsden.
433900 J. Milne.
2046239 B. M. Morrison.
427.881 P. V. Newman.
2028615 D. Noyes.
2008648 B. W. O'Keefe.
430421 M. F. Oliver.
2025516 M. W. Osborne.
2004956 S. M. Overend.
424058 E. Parker.
2058087 V. Parker.
430042 M. L. Perfect.
885499 M. M. Perrin.
457254 B. Pick.
432291 D. Potter.
428760 B. A. Pratt.
426362 N. E. Raines.
2011929 B. Rase.
430783 E. A. Reid.
2013672 J. P. Reid.
458831 N. E. Rogers.
468202 G. Rollings.
2991503 D. Ross.
2148024 M. B. Sheen.
447833 F. Shields.
2038121 M. T. Shepherd.
451120 I. M. Sidle.
434678 D. J. Simons.
2059119 J. E. Smith.
2086289 J. B. Summers.
2050646 C. M. Taylor.
2009729 E. A. Taylor.
474821 T. D. Thomas.
2052756 J. Thompson.
2004815 R. Thrush.
423161 M. H. Tomblin.
433526 E. Tomlinson.
2051203 M. Townsend.
2049408 C. Triner.
452994 G. M. Tysoe.
425646 K. M. Voice.
433661 E. Walker.
2082198 E. A. Wennell.
2029133 R. E. Weston.
2042036 A. C. Whillans.
456660 M. M. Wills.
2010843 D. M. Wilson.
2088715 D. Wright.
2016137 I. D. Wyatt.
426541 L. F. Yuill.

 Acting Corporals
2055862 M. K. Forrest.
462571 K. M. Rollings.

 Leading Aircraftwomen

440369 Y. Anton.
469415 J. V. Arthey.
2065992 G. A. Arthur.
2131785 M. N. Ash.
2135961 J. Ashton.
2125319 B. E. E. Baker.
2140716 J. A. Baker.
2080801 M. E. Baker.
2133539 L. Bartram.
2138035 G. P. Bateson.
2018864 V. E. Beaney.
2094183 M. E. Bennett.
2130571 H. Benwick.
435760 R. Birkett.
483379 M. R. Birmingham.
2036658 B. J. Bissell.
474832 J. D. Blackwell.
2092957 J. Bowerbank.
2095830 B. Boynton.
2040920 S. Brind.
2032680 M. Brown.
2028454 J. M. Bulmer.
482239 J. K. Cable.
2143364 E. Campbell.
434766 J. M. Campbell.
2070204 D. U. Carlyle.
2111458 E. C. Carter.
2137089 E. Cash.
458426 M. Chadwick.
2016029 B. M. Chapman.
2052250 E. A. Clarke.
2032178 E. Cluer.
2065646 I. E. Cockram.
457197 U. D. Compton.
2098763 E. M. Copeland
2146409 K. M. Cowdroy.
2149688 P. E. Cowling.
480292 M. D. Crapper.
458887 K. E. Crockford.
465789 J. Davison.
425813 E. M. Day.
2141642 P. I. Day.
468310 A. Deakin.
452974 J. De Gruchy.
2130384 R. V. Denny.
460372 E. Derrick.
2066577 E. Dorothy.
2057202 V. E. Doubtfire.
2038953 E. Duckworth.
2077202 E. Duffey.
2118420 E. Elliott.
2136761 M. Ellwood.
2000746 B. Elmsie.
2028513 E. M. Wyn-Evans.
2137070 M. Farrar.
478827 S. M. Farrow.
2004478 A. E. Fletcher.
432964 E. M. Flinton.
435148 K. L. Ford.
489737 V. J. Garnham.
457100 A. M. Gartell.
2000797 D. L. Galvin.
2005096 M. B. Gerred.
2011473 O. M. Goodchild.
488970 A. J. Grady.
457839 I. M. Green.
2032247 J. A. Gregory.
481761 M. Grimmett.
2048570 A. Guppy.
2035180 E. M. I. Halls.
473430 M. G. Hammond.
2024256 A. M. Hampshire.
2061472 B. L. Hanford.
2044528 M. Harness.
2027577 D. D. Harris.
2141021 S. G. Harrison.
468334 J. Hayes.
2068976 D. E. Heard.
458274 M. E. Hepburn.
2067352 E. V. A. Hermann.
454776 E. M. Herriott.
2012600 F. M. Hicks.
2058218 E. L. Higgs.
2002405 F. M. Horstman.
487104 G. M. A. E. Humphrey.
434556 M. Hunt.
2038105 E. R. Hunter.
2033092 D. K. Hyland.
2049940 J. Ingle.
2138661 M. Jackson.
2135960 Z. M. Jacques.
2064419 E. C. Jemmett.
466596 J. D. Jenkins.
472856 G. A. Johnstone.
2130355 M. H, Jones.
890672 H. E. Kimnell.
2063670 E. Kinnersley.
464408 D. Kirkham.
943040 C. Kitson.
456886 D. Lee.
2053958 D. K. Leeman.
2043402 K. R. Leith.
2075986 M. E. Lewis.
2006843 C. M. Lock.
426267 V. K. G. Lodge.
463049 A. T. Loutit.
490754 M. Lunn.
894602 N. McArthur.
2144616 J. O. McDonald.
433293 E. McRitchie.
2044942 I. Malcolm.
2032070 M. K. Megson.
435256 A. Meiklejohn.
2059261 A. W. Milns.
2044944 V. M. Muir.
457696 J. E. Murrell.
2007997 M. L. Naylor.
2029794 D. E. Newbury.
2025335 A. C. Niblett.
445234 H. M. Pearson.
2012562 E. E. Perry.
2133846 I. R. Pickering.
481285 E. P. M. Pine.
2105964 E. P. Pratt.
2075236 O. D. Preece.
471721 V. Preston.
2063466 P. G. Prosser.
2061114 S. Protheroe.
421009 J. Quinn.
882542 A. M. Riordan.
1664909 R. H. G. Robins.
2134186 E. D. Ruffles.
2004288 E. L. Scoffield.
2043158 M. J. Seabrook.
441059 E. A. A. Searies.
2055891 J. Shearer.
2105312 J. Shufflbotham.
2062493 D. Simpson.
2053837 A. N. Skinns.
467442 E. Slack.
2130308 L. F. Slade.
2035234 D. J. Smart.
464362 D. Smith.
2071633 L. M. Smith.
2032470 K. I. Sole.
487065 R. L. Spash.
2049061 N. A. Spindler.
2045066 J. Standbrook.
2137098 T. Steele.
2041017 B. C. Stewart.
447176 J. F. Taylor.
2115320 W. Taylor.
2090957 K. A. Temkin.
2041559 P. E. Travers.
451992 D. M. Turner.
462550 E. Varey.
469442 J. E. Wain.
2043547 H. Waugh.
478694 J. M. Webb.
20000332 C. E. M. Weedon.
485249 M. Widdowson.
2116556 J. G. Will.
489640 L. I. Wilson.
427542 M. Wilson.
2026669 V. W. Wood.
475106 B. M. Woodman.
2057217 J. Wright.
2028913 O. E. Wright.
449657 N. H. E. Wynne.

 Aircraftwomen 1st Class

2131569 L. Abdurehman.
476364 M. B. Bell.
2093169 J. Blackbird.
2048157 E. M. U. Davison.
466093 A. G. Godfrey.
458205 G. M. Hart.
483717 A. J. Kinver.
477932 A. P. Miller.
488576 J. E. Newman.
484565 A. J. Peacock.
434379 J. D. Wright.

 Aircraftwomen 2nd Class

488338 J. D. Brown.
2148809 D. N. Cox.
483625 F. A. Elkington.
2130412 P. E. Richards.
460473 D. A. E. Timms.

Royal Australian Air Force
 Wing Commander
J. M. Hampshire, DFC (Aus.256).

 Acting Wing Commanders
H. G. Cooke, DFC (Aus.403860).
W. L. Kerr (Aus.26642).

 Squadron Leaders

L. W. Carson (Aus.293136).
A. J. A. Day (Aus.407138).
T. K. Dollahan (Aus.163141).
A. H. Greenham (Aus.287411).
A. E. Guymer (Aus.405016).
D. M. Hannah (Aus.400412).
A. C. Hardy (Aus.400191).
J. H. McDougall (Aus.263157).
J. E. Pike (Aus.271018).
G. Roberts (Aus.253189).
J. P. H. Wheaton (Aus.402556).

 Acting Squadron Leaders

P. J. Cornwall, DFM (Aus.14850).
N. S. Griffen (Aus.257625).
A. T. Hogan (Aus.293036).
G. J. Jenkin (Aus.263017).
K. McIntyre, DFC (Aus.413230).
H. C. R. Marten (Aus.287434).
G. O. Singleton (Aus.400841).
G. E. Taylor (Aus.407690).

 Flight Lieutenants

H. L. F. Bader (Aus.293131).
N. K. Baker (Aus.410205).
R. H. Brown (Aus.401500).
H. L. Connell (Aus.409084).
R. J. Conroy (Aus.412113).
S. A. Crichton (Aus.414473).
J. W. Creighton (Aus.410217).
G. G. Dangar (Aus.264373).
C. G. Fereday (Aus.410116).
W. S. Ferguson (Aus.257623).
F. J. Hanson (Aus.407958).
J. Harrison (Aus.417073).
R. R. Huxtable (Aus.264705).
M. A. Kemp (Aus.416218).
J. M. Kirkman (Aus.406017).
W. Leach (Aus.425524).
C. H. Lewis (Aus.409558).
V. J. McCauley (Aus.403936).
A. J. Newton (Aus.14040).
R. J. Robert (Aus.408179).
J. R. Ross (Aus.401721).
J. L. Sharpe (Aus.264716).
R. H. Sutton (Aus.407959).
B. S. Tait (Aus.403608).
H. P. Van Renen (Aus.409258).
C. G. Walker (Aus.406336).
K. A. Witford (Aus.417256).
F. A. Woithe (Aus.416305).
E. C. Wright (Aus.413813).

 Acting Flight Lieutenants

L. J. Dyke (Aus.10192).
L. J. Hart (Aus.423725).
T. H. Hollis (Aus.5001).
D. G. Highman (Aus.406394).
J. A. O'Meara (Aus.401828).
C. C. Peacock (Aus.408158).
F. C. Pearce (Aus.412834).

 Flying Officers

M. Adams (Aus.400613).
G. R. Anderson, DFC (Aus.413330).
R. E. Bavington (Aus.403895).
R. N. Bell (Aus.406322).
K. J. Biltoft (Aus.4264).
J. L. Breed (Aus.415610).
F. J. Brenton (Aus.418051).
W. H. Brooker (Aus.407982).
J. C. Buckland (Aus.401006).
J. K. Cowan (Aus.410856).
D. B. Dalton (Aus.420863).
J. Darling (Aus.418998).
R. D. Hodgen (Aus.413594).
J. A. C. Kennedy, DFC (Aus.409001).
C. W. King (Aus.420682).
C. M. Lawson (Aus.409843).
R. T. Loury (Aus.426628).
J. A. McLachlan (Aus.412260).
S. J. Montgomery (Aus.423277).
B. G. Neill (Aus.414818).
R. C. Neilson (Aus.412652).
J. J. Parker (Aus.412829).
F. J. B. Parnell (Aus.415091).
R. C. Pritchard (Aus.400123).
R. M. Robson (Aus.406491).
D. J. Roydhouse (Aus.419162).
B. G. Sago (Aus.401671).
R. M. Sommerville (Aus.422735).
E. D. Stuart (Aus.22579).
J. E. C. Tait (Aus.36040).
V. R. Thatcher (Aus.420302).
R. G. Tickner (Aus.420304)
G. V. K. Vale (Aus.207818).
G. Walker (Aus.411061).
J. R. C. Walton (Aus.414530).
T. W. Webster (Aus.421063).
C. S. Wilson (Aus.425786).
K. A. Wilson (Aus.414449).
J. S. Yull (Aus.415296).

 Pilot Officers

E. A. Brown (Aus.415225).
A. C. Dutch (Aus.428770).
L. A. Einsaar, D.F.M (Aus.407318).
W. T. K. Hall (Aus.426744).
R. Lyall (Aus.409160).
M. E. Mills (Aus.425866).
T. B. Smith (Aus.6122).
W. Summerton (Aus.419355).

 Warrant Officers

W. K. Bridges (Aus.415502).
J. L. Cavenagh (Aus.426044).
S. J. Farrell (Aus.412809).
L. T. J. Holm (Aus.425011).
F. W. Moss (Aus.421040).
G. R. Oliver (Aus.415352).
R. J. O'Sullivan (Aus.415910).
E. J. P. H. Power (Aus.421078).
R. W. Scott (Aus.418184).
K. C. Tweedie (Aus.417136).
J. H. White (Aus.409974).

 Flight Sergeants

Aus.434213 L. R. Bodey.
Aus.410317 G. M. Drummond.
Aus.1414 W. G. P. Elly.
Aus.2553 N. H. Georges.
Aus.25092 A. Gilbert.
Aus.425852 J. W. Howell.
Aus.14149 W. J. Litvensky.
Aus.418756 A. W. Matthews.
Aus.5640 K. W. Muzzell.
Aus.5220 C. F. A. Percy.
Aus.8637 W. R. Philpot.
Aus.11406 T. C. Skinner.
Aus.434664 S. T. Sloane.
Aus.4308 C. E. Tessier.
Aus.6965 S. W. Woodroffe.

 Sergeants

Aus.31419 R. C. Brazier.
Aus.6562 D. H. L. Hely.
Aus.401215 N. G. Hemphill.
Aus.15163 G. Kelleher.
Aus.22358 H. S. Story.
Aus.41208 R. Thomas.

 Corporal
Aus.5858 D. B. Espie.

 Leading Aircraftman
Aus.29991 J. Riseley.

Royal Canadian Air Force
 Acting Group Captains
J. B. Millward.
W. P. Pleasace.

 Wing Commanders

W. P. Dunphy (Can/C.1038).
J. H. Giguere (Can/C.1997).
R. A. Gordon (Can/C.1467)
E. A. D. Hutton (Can/C.1124).
C. O. King (Can/C.2543).
W. R. Ouderkirk (Can/C.3553).
S. A. Terroux (Can/C.1943).

 Acting Wing Commanders

J. F. P. Clarke (Can/J.15167).
E. T. M. Duggan (Can/C.3043).
G. J. J. Edwards (Can/J.14045).
P. J. Grant (Can/C.1521).
R. J. Hardingham (Can/J.4691).
D. V. Button (Can/C.4088).
L. Lowenstein (Can/C.5020).
H. H. Poyntz (Can/C.5940).

 Squadron Leaders

J. A. Amos (Can/J.3515).
R. P. Bales (Can/C.9887).
F. K. Belton (Can/C.965).
W. A. Bentley (Can/C.3643).
C. E. Bishop (Can/C.3828).
D. A. Brewster (Can/C.9888).
D. A. Brownlee (Can/C.5194).
A. R. Dawson (Can/C.9831).
L. J. Dennett (Can/C.7178).
W. Farquharson (Can/3139).
D. B. Freeman (Can/J.15228).
T. J. G. Harper (Can/J.8333).
G. C. Hault (Can/C.2036).
R. R. B. Hoodspith (Can/C.1595).
F. J. B. Humphrys (Can/C.3309).
R. W. A. Ivermee (Can/C.451).
W. C. Kent (Can/C.867).
J. M. Kenyon (Can/C.4049).
B. J. Knight (Can/C.7711).
E. F. Kusch (Can/C.2867).
T. D. McKee (Can/C.5190).
W. N. F. McLean (Can/C.3228).
G. R. Munro (Can/C.3374).
A. L. Musselman (Can/C.8108).
W. J. Osborne (Can/C.7962).
C. J. Pattee (Can/C.5019).
H. W. Riley (Can/C.4069).
C. R. Scott (Can/C.3866).
W. Skelding (Can/C.7930).
N. K. Skelton (Can/C.1523).
A. C. Stagg (Can/C.8500).
R. H. Walker (Can/C.9425).
L. F. Wells (Can/J.7518).
A. D. Williams (Can/C.3986).

 Honorary Squadron Leaders
C. Clarke (Can/C.8513).
J. P. Lardie (Can/C.13176).
J. W. T. Van Gorder (Can/C.9981).

 Acting Squadron Leaders

C. A. S. Anderson (Can/J.6956).
J. C. Beers (Can/J.10712).
J. W. Bellis (Can/J.5502).
W. E. R. Boone (Can/C.9830).
D. Boyle (Can/J.4325).
N. M. Boyd (Can/C.15550).
E. A. Brain (Can 73.16428).
F. D. Cleland (Can/C.8532).
R. Cushley (Can/C.9306).
C. Edgar (Can/C.8676).
J. J. Feller (Can/C.3972).
W. W. Flynn (Can/C.4700).
L. R. Freeman (Can/C.2660).
N. J. Gallagher (Can/C.9371).
W. G. Gardiner (Can/J.8137).
K. T. Hawley (Can/C.4788).
D. A. Inman (Can/J.16149).
F. T. Judan (Can/J.9508).
P. S. Leggat (Can/J.4788).
J. G. M. Loomis (Can/C.8264).
H. F. C. Lount (Can/C.7284).
D. W. McMartin (Can/C.10845).
N. L. Magnusson (Can/J.17168).
D. J. Neville (Can/C.9010).
G. W. Paul (Can/C.7511).
T. R. Walker (Can/C.1869).
J. P. Walmsley (Can/C.15564).
C. L. Walton (Can/C.7721).
H. J. Wilson (Can/C.8863).
S. R. Wyman (Can/J.8330).

 Chaplain
The Rev. W. J. M. Swan.

 Flight Lieutenants

R. M. Ainslie (Can/C.21772).
E. S. Annis (Can/J.12725).
A. D. Baillie (Can/C.13665).
L. T. Banner (Can/C.13127).
R. N. Bassarab (Can/J.22239).
H. M. Bell (Can/C.6053).
P. G. Blades (Can/J.6371).
S. M. Bolton (Can/C.11394).
A. F. Broadbridge (Can/C.12177).
R. Burns, DFC (Can/J.18363).
C. J. Cameron (Can/C.5627).
W. I. Campbell Can/C.7964).
L. C. Card (Can/C.15730).
H. H. Gordon-Cooper (Can/J.20364).
J. C. Copeland (Can/J.9421).
W. Copley (Can/C.10938).
W. W. J. David (Can/C.11892).
H. A. W. Dawson (Can/C.7118).
P. K. Deane (Can/J.13844).
H. De Solla (Can/J.14707).
W. J. H. Disher (Can/C.12378).
E. O. Doyle (Can/J.11471).
H. E. Duggleby (Can/J.10955).
H. W. Eggleston (Can/C.7699).
C. J. Evans (Can/J.3731).
C. B. Feight (Can/J.13022).
A. R. Fisher (Can/J.22571).
R. G. Frederick (Can/J.8125).
H. P. Fuller (Can/J.17752).
J. E. German (Can/C.8992).
N. Green (Can/C.9030).
F. H. Hachmann (Can/J.11181).
D. G. Hall (Can/C.17597).
W. S. Hall (Can/C.12380).
B. A. Harper (Can/J.16518).
C. R. Higgens (Can/C.3371).
5. S. Holland (Can/J.16395).
J. P. C. Howard (Can/C.4991).
R. M. Howard (Can/C.7279).
D. G. Bell-Irving (Can/J.10640).
H. A. Ivens (Can/J.10649).
G. W. Jacques (Can/C.11201).
W. G. Klassen (Can/C.9890).
A. M. Larson (Can/J.12841).
H. D. Link (Can/J.11848).
P. N. J. Logan (Can/J.17678).
N. R. Logan (Can/J.11467).
H. S. Lowerison (Can/C.8783).
H. C. Lyle (Can/C.11378).
D. A. McAlpine (Can/C.3056).
B. L. Miller (Can/J.17436).
J. H. Miller (Can/J.29576).
J. A. J. Murray (Can/J.12471).
H. J. Nodder (Can/J.14733).
A. J. Norton (Can/J.11961).
D. F. O'Neill (Can/J.24506).
S. M. Paulson (Can/C.13570).
G. H. Pierce (Can/C.16596).
R. C. Pirie (Can/J.14138).
R. Rawsthorne (Can/J.22791).
W. R. Rothwell (Can/C.22927).
J. D. Runkle (Can/C.6448).
J. E. R. St. Amour (Can/C.13682).
F. M. Sawyer (Can/J.10596).
W. M. Schierer (Can/J.20063).
C. F. B. Seager (Can/C.10194).
L. W. Seath (Can/J.10275).
G. C. Smith (Can/J,1803).
P. C. Smith (Can/J. 8223).
C. E. B. Stewart (Can/J.8152).
D. B. Stewart (Can/C.13907).
E. J. Stockall (Can/C.8029).
R. H. Thomson (Can/J.10280).
5. F. D. Tuke (Can/C.17384).
N. I. Tycho (Can/J.23109).
P. C. Wall (Can/C.15946).
S. J. Waller (Can/J.10012).
W. J. Wilson (Can/C.6118).
H. H. Woodhead (Can/C.15868).

 Acting Flight Lieutenants

T. E. C. Ainslie, DFC (Can/C.28055).
J. M. Anguish (Can/J.8435).
H. N. Cuming (Can/J.19790).
H. D. Davy (Can/J.17815).
O. W. Fonger, DFC (Can/J.21918).
J. E. Johnston (Can/C.15932).
R. La Turner (Can/C.27109).
D. I. Mackenzie (Can/C.19225).
G. R. Panchuk (Can/C.18825).
C. S. Railton (Can/J.26609).
R. P. Schwalm (Can/C.18951).
J. A. Soden (Can/J.28460).
P. C. Thompson (Can/J.28501).
W. A. Warwick (Can/C.16470).
L. J. Wilson (Can/J.16956).

 Flying Officers

W. Baker (Can/J.23291).
R. E. Barnlund (Can/J.27284).
G. H. Barrable (Can/C.87517).
R. W. Barton (Can/J.87463).
J. C. P. Bauset (Can/J.23639).
J. W. Bonner (Can/J.17808).
R. C. Clark (Can/J.17992).
A. S. Coldridge (Can/J.26625).
O. Cook (Can/J.37165).
R. V. Desaultels (Can/J.26303).
W. F. Doherty (Can/J.37497).
W. A. Dunn (Can./C.19764).
B. W. Dunning (Can/J.19678).
H. C. Eyjolfsson, DFC (Can/J.85015).
P. E. H. Ferguson (Can/J.40181).
G. A. Fox (Can/J.35521).
H. M. Fox (Can/C.7729).
S. J. Fox (Can/C.85210).
F. P. Grant (Can/J.17870).
F. R. Kearns (Can/J.36358).
G. E. Langville (Can/J.85756).
J. G. Y. Lavoie (Can/J.22704).
D. A. Lennie (Can/J.24617).
W. A. Lethbridge (Can/J.18561).
E. B. Lewis (Can/C.37324).
J. E. R. Locke (Can/J.25433).
T. E. R. Lodge (Can/J.25483).
H. W. McDonald (Can/J.25007).
R. E. Mackerrow (Can/J.36233).
R. D. McLaren (Can/J.17178).
D. B. MacLennan (Can/J.39392).
W. Marsden (Can/C.29453).
D. N. Meyers (Can/J.87283).
H. D. Midland (Can/J.24931).
D. A. Newman (Can/J.6641).
F. J. Otten (Can/J.15498).
L. Panzer (Can/J.27423).
E. R. Patrick (Can/J.15261).
N. A. Phibbs (Can/J.19137).
L. A. Plummer (Can./J.26508).
R. E. Priestman (Can/C.19539).
G. G. Rattle (Can/J.17653).
A. T. Richardson (Can/J.29330).
J. H. Robertson (Can/J.88784).
M. J. Seguin (Can/J.87910).
G. L. Sheahan (Can/J.35383).
R. J. F. Sherk (Can/J.15237).
B. F. Thirlwell (Can/J.36708).
J. A. Wilding (Can/J.27908).

 Pilot Officers

G. J. Anton (Can/J.92443).
H. S. Bell (Can/J.87701).
W. D. Beacom (Can/J.90223).
W. V. Beaulieu (Can/J.91018).

 Warrant Officers
J. H. Contant (Can/R.125297).
C. R. McRae, DFM (Can/R.191057).

 Warrant Officers 1st Class

K. M. Forsythe (Can/R.117274).
J. R. Gosby (Can/130A).
R. L. Jones (Can/R.50717).
J. Maskell (Can/626).
E. H. Miller (Can/C.7623).
E. H. Ranson (Can /R. 162125).
J. Walmsley (Can/2464).

 Warrant Officer 2nd Class
P. Weir (Can/144A).

 Acting Warrant Officers
R. E. Perry (Can/6610).
J. E. R. Pruneau (Can/R.66972).
M. S. Sargeant (Can/R.99002).

 Flight Sergeants

Can/R.61884 M. Anderson.
Can/4299 R. G. C. Beatty.
Can/R.70747 J. A. G. V. Beauregarde.
Can/R.53501 E. L. Bradley.
Can/4811 M. H. Brooks.
Can/R.104195 H. N. Coll.
Can/R.54601 S. Colmer.
Can/R.50276 G. Desjardins.
Can/50197 J. S. Eaton.
Can/R.69014 W. J. Gray.
Can/R.50300 C. Gunne.
Can/R.76080 H. L. Harper.
Can/R.98776 R. G. Hermanson.
Can/6618 W. E. Higinbotham.
Can/R.53004 A. D. Job.
Can/R.52307 A. Jones.
Can/R.112556 R. W. Justice.
Can/11611 K. D. Leslie.
Can/R.161644 N. Marcus.
Can/R.60410 J. E. Melton.
Can/7832 W. Michael.
Can/R.57625 E. Miller.
Can/R.50256 F. D. Mitton.
Can/R.83647 W. K. Morton.
Can/R.68160 H. A. Mott.
Can/R.51597 F. J. Otway.
Can/R.64063 G. E. Pidduck.
Can/R.131517 F. E. Reain.
Can/R.160354 G. K. Sherwin.
Can/R.52977 G. Snape.
Can/R.164356 G. L. Stokx.
Can/R.54924 E. B. Stone.
Can/R.4003 E. M. Waring.
Can/R.80373 E. G. Warrington.
Can/R.4145A D. L. Whellans.

 Acting Flight Sergeants
Can/R.124136 J. Cheremkora.
Can/R.95873 H. R. Hawkins.
Can/R.107859 W. A. Newman.

 Sergeants

Can/R.60701 N. G. Allen.
Can/R.82220 A. L. Argue.
Can/R.53385 C. A. Baker.
Can/R.190579 R. H. Banks.
Can/R.73065 C. F. Bedford.
Can/R.64450 E. H. J. Berryman.
Can/R.76479 R. A. Blanchard.
Can/R.65602 C. H. Bowins.
Can/R.67580 G. A. Brown.
Can/R.135553 J. I. A. Chenier.
Can/R.68056 W. H. Cook.
Can/R.61317 H. A. Dale.
Can/R.6535 J. E. Dale.
Can/R.84027 G. A. Deverell.
Can/R.65077 E. A. Digout.
Can/R.90552 J. G. Dodgson.
Can/R.107352 G. D. Dowler.
Can/U.202115 G. O. Duffy.
Can/R.58405 L. P. Eckstrand.
Can/R.63688 A. K. Fair.
Can/R.52194 A. W. Faux.
Can/R.63692 R. V. Finch.
Can/R.109259 G. R. M. Gibson.
Can/R.63643 K. R. Greenfield.
Can/R.119027 K. W. Hall.
Can/R.99771 J. Hogan.
Can/R.86389 J. L. Horner.
Can/R.79722 T. D. Jamieson.
Can/R.64058 W. Keller.
Can/R.71514 A. G. Kelly.
Can/R.62355 T. C. Lane.
Can/R.82596 J. C. Le Blanc.
Can/R.204124 K. E. Lussier.
Can/R.65314 D. McLellan.
Can/2083A. A. L Mellis.
Can/R.149196 J. Nind.
Can/R.53090 M. Nichols.
Can/R.145196 E. J. Ouelette.
Can/R.197195 P. E. Palmer.
Can/R.122035 A. T. Pearson.
Can/R.92270 D. A. Rankine.
Can/R.52025 L. Renaud.
Can/R.55006 J. R. Renouf.
Can/R.108503 M. J. Rocheleau.
Can/R.61405 N. Slack.
Can/R.60037 M. Smith.
Can/R.143714 A. B. Stanley.
Can/R.62027 F. W. Tiffin.
Can/R.140056 C. J. Walker.
Can/R.143279 F. C. Widiner.
Can/R.104679 C. L. M. Wilcox.
Can/R.223500 J. T. Wyers.

 Acting Sergeants
Can/R.214955 G. B. Daines.
Can/R.143074 H. E. Lock.
Can/R.96284 C. W. Warner.

 Corporals

Can/R.158787 H. Bach.
Can/R.61847 E. A. Ball.
Can/R.72901 I. W. Blondon.
Can/R.102025 A. F. Boehme.
Can/R.71202 C. C. Brooking.
Can/R.76195 D. H. Bruce.
Can/R.61885 A. G. Burwood.
Can/R.117134 J. E. Dufresne.
Can/R.153949 P. Eustace.
Can/R.91172 T. A. H. Field.
Can/R-57629 R. J. Fraser.
Can/R.99312 J. L. R. Gallant.
Can/R.99326 A. C. Geldhart.
Can/R.71309 H. C. Green.
Can/R.89617 H. S. Groff.
Can/R.80816 Rex Guest.
Can/R.74166 J. D. Hall.
Can/R.85551 J. C. Honan.
Can/R.98576 G. J. A. Kidd.
Can/R.123283 R. C. Lavery.
Can/R.83987 J. V. Lennox.
Can/R.86368 R. A. McCombie.
Can/R.77668 E. A. McGarvey.
Can/R.51924 W. J. MacKenzie.
Can/R.87167 A. D. McLeod.
Can/R.128128 D. A. MacLeod.
Can/R.131451 D. M. F. Manson.
Can/R.83824 A. Medhurst.
Can/R.132483 E. A. Micklewright.
Can/R.122510 J. B. Moody.
Can/R.52586 W. E. Moody.
Can/R.84976 R. R. Morris.
Can/R.90615 T. R. Morrison.
Can/R.139120 F. Noble.
Can/R.100102 L. J. F. Paquin.
Can/R.161513 E. Patterson.
Can/R.149980 G. E. Phillips.
Can/R.97806 M. Ritchie.
Can/R.133046 D. Ross.
Can/R.87820 D. M. Ross.
Can/R.76486 W. P. Sampson.
Can/R.102847 W. A. Sanderson.
Can/R.73381 A. Savoie.
Can/R.126327 E. T. Simpson.
Can/R.139822 H. R. Stewart.
Can/R.70824 H. G. Streight.
Can/R.107076 S. Thompson.
Can/R.181799 P. Trinker.

 Acting Corporals

Can/R.178728 L. M. Archibald.
Can/R.133461 R. H. Lord.
Can/R.161879 H. W. Mau.
Can/R.134940 J. T. Mawby.
Can/R.89050 J. Owen.
Can/R.154940 F. J. Tilley.
Can/R.136543 J. L. G. Turgeon.
Can/R.169635 D. N. West.

 Leading Aircraftmen

Can/R.139624 J. A. Anderson.
Can/R.176503 E. D. Artz.
Can/R.96549 J. W. M. Begin.
Can/R.174388 A. J. Blake.
Can/R.279099 G. J. Bourgois.
Can/R.86526 E. F. Breach.
Can/R.170702 H. F. Brown.
Can/R.104709 S. B. Brown.
Can/R.171498 J. J. G. L. Carrier.
Can/R.181374 G. E. Cowl.
Can/R.183361 J. F. Cruikshank.
Can/R.96204 J. W. R. Cunneyworth.
Can/R.162502 C. D. Davis.
Can/R.139409 R. J. Dixon.
Can/R.170699 W. C. Drinkwater.
Can/R.105970 E. E. Evernden.
Can/R.101436 W. A. Exworthy.
Can/R.134877 E. T. Foidart.
Can/R.169961 R. A. Grant.
Can/R.202396 A. Gutner.
Can/R.108810 W. M. Hall.
Can/R.133408 N. A. Harrison.
Can/R.110604 S. Joel.
Can/R.99322 G. O. Kelley.
Can/R.146299 M. Kibzey.
Can/R.156006 D. Kidd.
Can/R.114551 G. A. Koch.
Can/R.127049 J. H. J. B. Legault.
Can/R.94698 G. R. Lemon.
Can/R.159509 J. R. Lunan.
Can/R.158988 S. T. McEvoy.
Can/R.175040 D. W. Maker.
Can/R.62837 J. F. J. M. Marquis.
Can/R.179185 J. J. R. A. Cinq-Mars.
Can/R.12020A W. E. Marshall.
Can/R.145659 C. M. Mehlenbacher.
Can/R.267068 J. M. Morie.
Can/R.109305 H. K. Newinger.
Can/R.149384 C. Nygard.
Can/R.164911 J. V. C. E. Paradis.
Can/R.183742 K. F. Porter.
Can/R.160168 A. A. Pratt.
Can/R.182394 M. Roher.
Can/R.212112 W. Romaniuk.
Can/R.163818 J. T. Shirkie.
Can/R.168109 J. J. Sims.
Can/R.103553 M. Stickney.
Can/R.100287 F. W. S. Swain.
Can/R.167971 F. J. Walter.
Can/R.114957 B. J. Warberg.
Can/R.145450 R. E. Warren.
Can/R.149998 D. Wiley.
Can/R.143992 D. D. Wilson.
Can/R.138046 G. R. Wood.

 Aircraftman 1st Class
Can/R.165347 D. G. Mackenzie.
Can/R.166074 T. J. Phelps.

Royal Canadian Air Force (Women's Division)
 Acting Squadron Officers
H. A. Buik (Can/V.30111).
E. A. Engelsen (Can/V.30019).

 Flight Officers
I. V. Gibson (Can/V.30179).
F. M. Silverlock (Can/V.30368).

 Section Officer
K. J. Wagner (Can/V.30426).

 Sergeant
Can/W.307064 M. E. Norum.

 Corporals
Can/W.300211 Y. M. Cunningham.
Can/W.301558 M. G. Gillett.

 Leading Aircraftwoman
Can/W.312337 H. D. V. O. Woodcroft.

Royal New Zealand Air Force
 Acting Wing Commander
H. H. J. Miller, DFC, AFC (N.Z.1996).

 Acting Squadron Leaders

W. C. S. Bainbridge (N.Z.2321).
N. A. Cresswell, DFC (N.Z.41472).
A. E. Davis, DFC (N.Z.411719).
I. G. Dunn (N.Z.412214).
G. R. Gunn (N.Z.411397).
F. W. Kilgour (N.Z.412701).
C. F. Ormerod (N.Z.413340).
D. J. T. Sharp (N.Z.2145).

 Flight Lieutenants

K. H. Beecroft (N.Z.412189).
D. G. E. Brown (N.Z.405225).
D. L. Clow (N.Z.41877).
G. R. Dickson (N.Z.405261).
E. L. Eason (N.Z.412305).
R. R. G. Fisher (N.Z.412671).
L. G. Fowler (N.Z.411878).
P. S. McBride (N.Z.40980).
W. McDowall (N.Z.414648)
K. P. F. Neill (N.Z.41145).
R. C. Savers (N.Z.41943).
W. J. R. Scollay (N.Z.41497).
J. W. Watson (N.Z.41436).
S. S. Williams (N.Z.412297).

 Acting Flight Lieutenants

H. D. Alcock (N.Z.402928).
T. G. Dill, DFM (N.Z.42292).
C. G. McCardle (N.Z.421072).
D. G. G. Morgan (N.Z.39012).
K. Smith (N.Z.411948).

 Flying Officers

D. R. Browne, DFM (N.Z.416086).
C. G. Clarke (N.Z.639098).
G. C. Couper (N.Z.417026).
J. A. Crawford (N.Z.425739).
H. J. Dalzell (N.Z.414263).
C. J. Hector (N.Z.319354).
W. J. Marr (N.Z.416513).
M. Tovey (N.Z.401337).
J. S. Wilkinson (N.Z.4211042).
D. C. Colmore-Williams (N.Z.40816).

 Flight Sergeant
N.Z.37214 M. R. Murphy.

 Sergeant
N.Z.437442 R. J. Burkitt.

 Leading Aircraftman
N.Z.413608 W. J. Murphy.

South African Air Force
 Lieutenant Colonels

P. G. Bodley (102215).
A. G. W. Hammond (68002).
J. Larentz (102755V).
D. E. D. Meaker (102984V).
D. U. Nel, DFC (102987V).
L. H. G. Shuttleworth, DFC (1027V).
P. E. Stableford (P.102685V).
E. B. Woodrow (102994V).

 Acting Lieutenant Colonel
G. L. Bateman (102932V).

 Majors

E. Baden-Cross (203363V).
R. J. Clements (102132V).
M. E. Draper (130071V).
S. Fuchs (202884V) (deceased).
G. E. C. Hudson (52034V).
E. Jones (96983V).
H. C. Nicholas (179841V).
E. G. White (203098V).
P. H. Wishart (203142V).
F. P. Wyles (203134V).

 Captains

A. M. Begg (187300V).
G. W. Boyes (52356V).
E. T. Brunskell (102239V).
G. R. Connell, DFC (103604V).
N. P. Coole (203024V).
J. B. Davis (203154V).
M. Geldenhuys (47928V).
R. E. Gray (15021V).
H. T. Hamel (203329V).
P. Hempson (6118V).
J. F. Nortje (47493V).
J. Ovenstone (103159V).
W. J. Parker (94133V).
G. V. Parsons (202920).
G. R. Percival (30329V).
T. B. Phillips (203066).
A. W. Short (P.605V).
J. F. Smiths (P.5663V).
W. A. R. Thorogood (34125V).
C. R. Wallace (202936V).

 Lieutenants

J. M. G. Anderson (328517V).
R. J. Bayford (20357V).
W. J. Boyce (98776V).
G. C. Bow (251515).
A. L Bristol (100388V).
M. S. Britz (206447V).
J. O. Brown (208669V).
L. H. Brown (103800V).
A. E. Burnett (103833V).
P. Campbell (103130V).
H. A. F. Collie (26934V).
D. Davidson (317463V).
J. E. Davies (202927).
E. D. K. Frank (329226V).
V. Goldman (20297V).
R. A. Harburn (207195V).
D. J. S. Jansen Tan Rensburg (206835V).
R. B. Kihn (542561V).
T. Kipling (573009V).
R. Kuttner (542609V).
G. N. McGuire (542592V).
D. W. MacLeod (542299V).
E. Manne (328316V).
I. Margowsky (206403V).
E. P. Matthews (211727V).
H. Matthews (328749V).
P. Metcalf (99438V).
G. E. Millborrow (328567V).
H. J. Milton (52456V).
A. Muir (74894V).
C. W. Nunneley (328668V).
M. W. V. Odendaal (205865V).
H. M. Preston (208898V).
D. Reeves (153183).
H. Stein (223594V).
M. J. D. Stubbs (328354V).
T. C. L. Symmes (125324V).
D. B. Tatters All (542496V) (deceased).
D. H. Theron (205535V).
P. J. Van Du Merwe (542510V).
P.M. Van Rensburg (97769V).
D. N. Vernon (328903V).

 2nd Lieutenant
C. B. Susskind (543190V) (deceased).

 Warrant Officers

H. De Bruiyn (29619V).
D. J. Mahon (98452V).
Z. C. Helps (41906V).
P. D. Jourdan (315598V).
R. Miles (P.4737V).

 Flight Sergeants

32485V W. F. Coe.
115243 H. M. Kennedy.
P.4575V J. G. Theron.
449567 C. A. Van-Bocnoue.
P.5641V W. P. J. Van-Der-Westhuizen.

 Sergeants

22979V W. J. Gouws.
28839V M. D. Marnewick.
P.5490V G. D. Pearce.
231495V A. B. Scott.
58441V E. Wolf.

 Acting Sergeant
J. E. Ballantyne (52380V).

 Corporal
30215V L. D. B. Robins.

 Temporary Air Corporal
48121V D. J. De Waal.

 Air Mechanics
579067V J. C. Carter.
6873V L. R. Clarke.
577244V B. J. Jooste.

South African Air Force (Women's Division)
 Major
M. A. Theunissen (F.46624V).

 Lieutenant
V. Venter (F.262645V).

 Flight Sergeant
F.153228V B. L. Smith.

Royal Indian Air Force
 Flight Lieutenants
S. G. Deshpande (Ind/2294).
G. Wakefield (Ind/2184).

 Acting Flight Lieutenant
M. A. Sarwate (Ind/1966).

 Pilot Officer
K. Chandra (Ind/2721).

 Lance Corporal
1171 Gewercis Shaino.

 Privates
1288 Benyamin Khoshaba.
10575 Menas Gewergis.

 Non-Commissioned Engineer Follower
Ahmed Igbal.

 Civilians
Mrs. D. Chick.
S. W. Gray.
D. A. Jones.
Mohamed Pir Khan.
Herbert Francis Nichols.

References

Birthday Honours
1945 in the United Kingdom
1945 awards